A complete list of Wildlife Trust nature reserves in Scotland, Wales, Northern Ireland and England:

A

 Abberton Reservoir (Essex Wildlife Trust)
 Abbey Fishponds (Berks, Bucks & Oxon Wildlife Trust)
 Abbots Moss (Cheshire Wildlife Trust)
 Abbotts Hall Farm (Essex Wildlife Trust)
 Abercamlo Bog (Radnorshire Wildlife Trust)
 Abercorris (North Wales Wildlife Trust)
 Aberduna (North Wales Wildlife Trust)
 Abington Meadows (The Wildlife Trust for Bedfordshire, Cambridgeshire and Northamptonshire)
 Abram Flash (The Wildlife Trust for Lancashire, Manchester & north Merseyside)
 Addiewell Bing (Scottish Wildlife Trust)
 Adel Dam Nature Reserve (Yorkshire Wildlife Trust)
 Adle Mudflats (Suffolk Wildlife Trust)
 Agden Bog Nature Reserve (The Wildlife Trust for Sheffield and Rotherham)
 Aileshurst Coppice (Worcestershire Wildlife Trust)
 Aisholt Wood (Somerset Wildlife Trust)
 Aldbury Nowers (Herts & Middlesex Wildlife Trust)
 Aldercar Flash (Nottinghamshire Wildlife Trust)
 Alderfen Broad (Norfolk Wildlife Trust)
 Aller & Beer Woods (Somerset Wildlife Trust)
 Allerthorpe Common Nature Reserve (Yorkshire Wildlife Trust)
 Allimore Green Common (Staffordshire Wildlife Trust)
 Allt Grug Garn (The Wildlife Trust for South & West Wales)
 Allt Pencnwc (The Wildlife Trust for South & West Wales)
 Allt-yr-Yn Local Nature Reserve (Gwent Wildlife Trust)
 Alpine Meadow (Herts & Middlesex Wildlife Trust)
 Altar Stones (Leicestershire & Rutland Wildlife Trust)
 Alvecote Meadows (Warwickshire Wildlife Trust)
 Alvecote Pools (Warwickshire Wildlife Trust) 
 Amberley Wildbrooks (Sussex Wildlife Trust)
 Amwell Quarry (Herts & Middlesex Wildlife Trust)
 Ancaster Valley (Lincolnshire Wildlife Trust)
 Ancells Farm (Hampshire & IOW Wildlife Trust)
 Andrew's Wood (Devon Wildlife Trust)
 Annesley Woodhouse Quarry (Nottinghamshire Wildlife Trust)
 Annstead Dunes (Northumberland Wildlife Trust)
 Ardley Quarry (Berks, Bucks & Oxon Wildlife Trust)
 Arger Fen & Spouse's Vale (Suffolk Wildlife Trust)
 Argill Woods Nature Reserve (Cumbria Wildlife Trust)
 Arle Grove (Gloucestershire Wildlife Trust)
 Arlesey Old Moat and Glebe Meadows (The Wildlife Trust for Bedfordshire, Cambridgeshire and Northamptonshire)
 Armstrong Wood (Cornwall Wildlife Trust)
 Arnold Memorial (Northumberland Wildlife Trust)
 Arnold's Meadow (Lincolnshire Wildlife Trust)
 Arreton Down (Hampshire & IOW Wildlife Trust)
 Arthur's Meadow (The Wildlife Trust for Bedfordshire, Cambridgeshire and Northamptonshire)
 Ash Moor (Devon Wildlife Trust)
 Ash Ranges (Surrey Wildlife Trust)
 Asham Meads (Berks, Bucks & Oxon Wildlife Trust)
 Ashberry Nature Reserve (Yorkshire Wildlife Trust)
 Ashculm Turbary (Devon Wildlife Trust)
 Ashford Warren & Hoads Wood (Kent Wildlife Trust) 
 Ashlawn Cutting (Warwickshire Wildlife Trust)
 Ashleworth Ham (Gloucestershire Wildlife Trust)
 Ashley Wood Nature Reserve (Dorset Wildlife Trust)
 Ashton Court Meadow (Avon Wildlife Trust)
 Ashtons Meadow (Nottinghamshire Wildlife Trust)
 Ashwell Quarry and Quarry Springs (Herts & Middlesex Wildlife Trust) 
 Askham Bog Nature Reserve (Yorkshire Wildlife Trust)
 Astley Moss (The Wildlife Trust for Lancashire, Manchester & north Merseyside)
 Aston Clinton Ragpits (Berks, Bucks & Oxon Wildlife Trust)
 Attenborough Nature Reserve (Nottinghamshire Wildlife Trust)
 Aubrey Buxton (Essex Wildlife Trust)
 Auchalton Meadow (Scottish Wildlife Trust)
 Aughton Woods (The Wildlife Trust for Lancashire, Manchester & north Merseyside)
 Augill Pasture Nature Reserve (Cumbria Wildlife Trust)
 Avery's Pightle (Berks, Bucks & Oxon Wildlife Trust)
 Avon Valley (Worcestershire Wildlife Trust)
 Ayr Gorge Woodlands (Scottish Wildlife Trust)
 Ayres Visitor Centre and Nature Trail (Manx Wildlife Trust)

B

 Baal Hill Wood (Durham Wildlife Trust)
 Babcary Meadows (Somerset Wildlife Trust)
 Badger's Hill (Worcestershire Wildlife Trust)
 Badgeworth (Gloucestershire Wildlife Trust)
 Baglan Reserve (The Wildlife Trust for South & West Wales)
 Bagmere (Cheshire Wildlife Trust)
 Bagmoor Common (Surrey Wildlife Trust)
 Bailey Einon (Radnorshire Wildlife Trust)
 Bakers Pit (Cornwall Wildlife Trust)
 Bakethin (Northumberland Wildlife Trust)
 Balcombe Marsh (Sussex Wildlife Trust)
 Balgavies Loch (Scottish Wildlife Trust)
 Ballachuan Hazel Wood (Scottish Wildlife Trust)
 Ballagan Glen (Scottish Wildlife Trust)
 Ballalough Reedbeds (Manx Wildlife Trust)
 Balloo Wetland (Ulster Wildlife Trust)
 Balloo Woodland (Ulster Wildlife Trust)
 Balls Wood (Herts & Middlesex Wildlife Trust)
 Ballynahone Bog (Ulster Wildlife Trust)
 Balnaguard Glen (Scottish Wildlife Trust)
 Bankhead Moss (Scottish Wildlife Trust)
 Banovallum House (Lincolnshire Wildlife Trust)
 Ban-y-Gor Woods (Gloucestershire Wildlife Trust)
 Barford Wood and Meadows (The Wildlife Trust for Bedfordshire, Cambridgeshire and Northamptonshire)
 Barkbooth Lot Nature Reserve (Cumbria Wildlife Trust)
 Barkway Chalk Pit (Herts & Middlesex Wildlife Trust)
 Barnaby's Sands and Burrows Marsh (The Wildlife Trust for Lancashire, Manchester & north Merseyside)
 Barnes Meadow (The Wildlife Trust for Bedfordshire, Cambridgeshire and Northamptonshire)
 Barnyards Marsh (Scottish Wildlife Trust)
 Barr Beacon (The Wildlife Trust for Birmingham and the Black Country)
 Barrow Blow Wells (Lincolnshire Wildlife Trust)
 Barrow Burn Wood (Northumberland Wildlife Trust)
 Barrow Haven Reedbed (Lincolnshire Wildlife Trust)
 Hook Common and Bartley Heath (Hampshire & IOW Wildlife Trust)
 Barton Broad National Nature Reserve (Norfolk Wildlife Trust)
 Barton Gravel Pit (The Wildlife Trust for Bedfordshire, Cambridgeshire and Northamptonshire)
 Barton Pool (Derbyshire Wildlife Trust)
 Baston Fen (Lincolnshire Wildlife Trust)
 Bateswood (Staffordshire Wildlife Trust)
 Bathampton Meadow (Avon Wildlife Trust)
 Bawsinch and Duddingston (Scottish Wildlife Trust)
 Bay Pond (Surrey Wildlife Trust)
 Beacon Hill (Gwent Wildlife Trust)
 Beacon Hill (Radnorshire Wildlife Trust)
 Beacon Hill Conservation Park (Nottinghamshire Wildlife Trust)
 Beacon Hill Urban Wildlife Centre (Dorset Wildlife Trust)
 Beaconwood and the Winsel (Worcestershire Wildlife Trust)
 Beales Meadows (Cornwall Wildlife Trust)
 Bedfords Parks (Essex Wildlife Trust)
 Beechwoods (The Wildlife Trust for Bedfordshire, Cambridgeshire and Northamptonshire)
 Begwary Brook (The Wildlife Trust for Bedfordshire, Cambridgeshire and Northamptonshire)
 Bell Crag Flow (Northumberland Wildlife Trust)
 Bellenden Road (London Wildlife Trust)
 Belmaduthy Dam (Scottish Wildlife Trust)
 Beltingham River Gravels (Northumberland Wildlife Trust)
 Bemersyde Moss (Scottish Wildlife Trust)
 Ben Mor Coigach (Scottish Wildlife Trust)
 Bentinick Banks (Nottinghamshire Wildlife Trust)
 Bernwood Meadows (Berks, Bucks & Oxon Wildlife Trust)
 Berry Wood (The Wildlife Trust for South & West Wales)
 Besthorpe Nature Reserve (Nottinghamshire Wildlife Trust)
 Betchworth Quarry (Surrey Wildlife Trust)
 Betty Church & Cwm Ivy (The Wildlife Trust for South & West Wales)
 Betty Daw's Wood (Gloucestershire Wildlife Trust)
 Beverley Meads and Fishponds Wood (London Wildlife Trust)
 Bickham Wood (Somerset Wildlife Trust)
 Big Pool Wood (North Wales Wildlife Trust)
 Big Waters (Northumberland Wildlife Trust)
 Bigbury Camp (Kent Wildlife Trust)
 Birch Moss Covert (Cheshire Wildlife Trust)
 Birch Road Pond (Shropshire Wildlife Trust)
 Birdbrook Nature Reserve (London Wildlife Trust)
 Birmingham EcoPark (The Wildlife Trust for Birmingham and the Black Country)
 Bishop Middleham Quarry (Durham Wildlife Trust)
 Bishop Monkton Railway Cutting Nature Reserve (Yorkshire Wildlife Trust)
 Bishop's Field (Worcestershire Wildlife Trust)
 Bishopswood Meadows (Somerset Wildlife Trust)
 Bisley & West End Commons (Surrey Wildlife Trust)
 Bissoe Valley (Cornwall Wildlife Trust)
 Black Brook (Staffordshire Wildlife Trust)
 Black Firs & Cranberry Bog (Staffordshire Wildlife Trust)
 Black Firs Wood (Cheshire Wildlife Trust)
 Black Lake (Cheshire Wildlife Trust)
 Black Moss Covert (Cheshire Wildlife Trust)
 Blacka Moor (Sheffield Wildlife Trust)
 Blackadon (Devon Wildlife Trust)
 Blackcraig Wood (Scottish Wildlife Trust)
 Blackhall Rocks (Durham Wildlife Trust)
 Blackmoor Copse (Wiltshire Wildlife Trust)
 Blaenant y Gwyddyl (The Wildlife Trust for South & West Wales)
 Blaen-y-Weirglodd (North Wales Wildlife Trust)
 Blagrove Common (Herts & Middlesex Wildlife Trust)
 Blakehill Farm (Wiltshire Wildlife Trust)
 Blake's Pools (Avon Wildlife Trust)
 Blashford Lakes (Hampshire & IOW Wildlife Trust)
 Blaxhall Common (Suffolk Wildlife Trust)
 Blenheim Farm (Berks, Bucks & Oxon Wildlife Trust)
 Blessingbourne (Ulster Wildlife Trust)
 Bloody Oak's Quarry (Leicestershire & Rutland Wildlife Trust)
 Blow's Downs (The Wildlife Trust for Bedfordshire, Cambridgeshire and Northamptonshire)
 Blue Bell Hill (Kent Wildlife Trust)
 Blue House Farm (Essex Wildlife Trust)
 Boathouse Field Nature Reserve (Cumbria Wildlife Trust)
 Boddington Meadow (The Wildlife Trust for Bedfordshire, Cambridgeshire and Northamptonshire)
 Bog Meadows (Ulster Wildlife Trust)
 Bogburn Flood Lagoons (Scottish Wildlife Trust)
 Boilton, Nab, Redscar and Tunbrook Woods (The Wildlife Trust for Lancashire, Manchester & north Merseyside)
 Bolgoed Quarry (The Wildlife Trust for South & West Wales)
 Bolton Percy Station Nature Reserve (Yorkshire Wildlife Trust)
 Bolton-on-Swale Lake Nature Reserve (Yorkshire Wildlife Trust)
 Bo'mains Meadow (Scottish Wildlife Trust)
 Bonny Wood (Suffolk Wildlife Trust)
 Boon's Copse (Somerset Wildlife Trust)
 Booton Common (Norfolk Wildlife Trust)
 Boston Road Brick Pits (Lincolnshire Wildlife Trust)
 Bosvenning Common (Cornwall Wildlife Trust)
 Bough Beech Visitor Centre (Kent Wildlife Trust)
 Boultham Mere (Lincolnshire Wildlife Trust)
 Bovey Heathfield (Devon Wildlife Trust)
 Bowdown Woods (Berks, Bucks & Oxon Wildlife Trust)
 Bowesfield (Tees Valley Wildlife Trust)
 Bowness on Solway Nature Reserve (Cumbria Wildlife Trust)
 Boynes Coppice and Meadows (Worcestershire Wildlife Trust)
 Bracketts Coppice (Dorset Wildlife Trust)
 Bradfield Woods (Suffolk Wildlife Trust)
 Bradlaugh Fields (The Wildlife Trust for Bedfordshire, Cambridgeshire and Northamptonshire)
 Brae Pasture Nature Reserve (Yorkshire Wildlife Trust)
 Braeburn Park (London Wildlife Trust)
 Bramley Bank Local Nature Reserve (London Wildlife Trust)
 Brampton Wood (The Wildlife Trust for Bedfordshire, Cambridgeshire and Northamptonshire)
 Branches Fork Meadows (Gwent Wildlife Trust)
 Brandon Hill Nature Park (Avon Wildlife Trust)
 Brandon Marsh SSSI Nature Reserve and Visitor Centre (Warwickshire Wildlife Trust)
 Brankley Pastures (Staffordshire Wildlife Trust)
 Brassey (Gloucestershire Wildlife Trust)
 Bray Pit (Berks, Bucks & Oxon Wildlife Trust)
 Breagle Glen (Manx Wildlife Trust)
 Brechfa Pool (Brecknock Wildlife Trust)
 Breck's Plantation (Nottinghamshire Wildlife Trust)
 Brenchley Wood (Kent Wildlife Trust)
 Brentmoor Heath (Surrey Wildlife Trust)
 Brewsdale (Tees Valley Wildlife Trust)
 Briarwood Banks (Northumberland Wildlife Trust)
 Brickfield Meadow (Sussex Wildlife Trust)
 Brilley Green Dingle (Herefordshire Nature Trust)
 Brimley Hill Mire (Somerset Wildlife Trust)
 Broad Colney Lakes (Herts & Middlesex Wildlife Trust)
 Broad Pool (The Wildlife Trust for South & West Wales)
 Broadham Down (Kent Wildlife Trust)
 Broadhead Clough Nature Reserve (Yorkshire Wildlife Trust)
 Broadhurst Edge Wood (Derbyshire Wildlife Trust)
 Broadmoor Wood (Worcestershire Wildlife Trust)
 Broadoak Orchard (Dorset Wildlife Trust)
 Broadstreet & Backside Commons (Surrey Wildlife Trust)
 Broadwater Lake (Herts & Middlesex Wildlife Trust)
 Broadway Gravel Pit (Worcestershire Wildlife Trust)
 Brock Wood (Scottish Wildlife Trust)
 Brockadale Nature Reserve (Yorkshire Wildlife Trust)
 Brockham Lime Works (Surrey Wildlife Trust)
 Brockholes Nature Reserve (The Wildlife Trust for Lancashire, Manchester & north Merseyside)
 Brockholes Wood (Derbyshire Wildlife Trust)
 Brockwells Meadows SSSI (Gwent Wildlife Trust)
 Bromeswell Green (Suffolk Wildlife Trust)
 Brook Meadow (Warwickshire Wildlife Trust)
 Brook Vessons (Shropshire Wildlife Trust)
 Brookes Reserve (Essex Wildlife Trust)
 Brookheys Covert (Cheshire Wildlife Trust)
 Brooklands Farm (Dorset Wildlife Trust)
 Brookwood Lye (Surrey Wildlife Trust)
 Brotheridge Green (Worcestershire Wildlife Trust)
 Broughton Down (Hampshire & IOW Wildlife Trust)
 Brown End Quarry (Staffordshire Wildlife Trust)
 Brown Robin Nature Reserve (Cumbria Wildlife Trust)
 Brown's Folly (Avon Wildlife Trust)
 Brown's Hill Quarry (Leicestershire & Rutland Wildlife Trust)
 Brownsea Island (Dorset Wildlife Trust)
 Bryn Pydew (North Wales Wildlife Trust)
 Brynna Woods (The Wildlife Trust for South & West Wales)
 Bryworth Lane Railway (Gloucestershire Wildlife Trust)
 Bubwith Acres (Somerset Wildlife Trust)
 Buff Wood (The Wildlife Trust for Bedfordshire, Cambridgeshire and Northamptonshire)
 Bugbrooke Meadow (The Wildlife Trust for Bedfordshire, Cambridgeshire and Northamptonshire)
 Bugdens Meadow (Dorset Wildlife Trust)
 Bugeilyn (Montgomeryshire Wildlife Trust)
 Bull's Wood (Suffolk Wildlife Trust)
 Bunny Old Wood (Nottinghamshire Wildlife Trust)
 Burfa Bog (Radnorshire Wildlife Trust)
 Burham Down (Kent Wildlife Trust) 
 Burham Marsh (Kent Wildlife Trust)
 Burledge Hill (Avon Wildlife Trust)
 Burners Heath and Swallows Pond (Surrey Wildlife Trust)* Burnhope Pond (Durham Wildlife Trust)
 Burns Beck Moss Nature Reserve (Cumbria Wildlife Trust)
 Burnt Wood (Staffordshire Wildlife Trust)
 Burtle Moor (Somerset Wildlife Trust)
 Burton and Chingford Ponds (Sussex Wildlife Trust)
 Burton Leonard Lime Quarries (Yorkshire Wildlife Trust)
 Burton Riggs Nature Reserve (Yorkshire Wildlife Trust)
 Bushmoor Coppice (Shropshire Wildlife Trust)
 Butterburn Flow (Cumbria Wildlife Trust)
 Butterburn Flow (Northumberland Wildlife Trust)
 Bwlytai Wood (Shropshire Wildlife Trust)
 Byfield Pool (The Wildlife Trust for Bedfordshire, Cambridgeshire and Northamptonshire)
 Bystock (Devon Wildlife Trust)

C

 Cabilla & Redrice Woods (Cornwall Wildlife Trust)
 Cadishead Moss (The Wildlife Trust for Lancashire, Manchester & north Merseyside)
 Cae Bryntywarch (Brecknock Wildlife Trust)
 Cae Eglwys (Brecknock Wildlife Trust)
 Cae Pwll Y Bo (Brecknock Wildlife Trust)
 Caeau Llety Cybi (The Wildlife Trust for South & West Wales)
 Caeau Pen y Clip (North Wales Wildlife Trust)
 Caeau Tan y Bwlch (North Wales Wildlife Trust)
 Caer Bran (Cornwall Wildlife Trust)
 Caldicot Pill (Gwent Wildlife Trust)
 Calley Heath Nature Reserve (Yorkshire Wildlife Trust)
 Calvert Jubilee (Berks, Bucks & Oxon Wildlife Trust)
 Calverton Road (Nottinghamshire Wildlife Trust)
 Cambourne (The Wildlife Trust for Bedfordshire, Cambridgeshire and Northamptonshire)
 Cambus Pools (Scottish Wildlife Trust)
 Camley Street Natural Park (London Wildlife Trust)
 Candlesby Hill Quarry (Lincolnshire Wildlife Trust)
 Cannop Bridge Marsh (Gloucestershire Wildlife Trust)
 Canon Tump Common (Herefordshire Nature Trust)
 Captain's Wood (Suffolk Wildlife Trust)
 Carbrook Ravine (Sheffield Wildlife Trust)
 Cardigan Bay Marine Wildlife Centre (The Wildlife Trust for South & West Wales)
 Cardigan Island (The Wildlife Trust for South & West Wales)
 Carlingnose Point (Scottish Wildlife Trust)
 Carlton Marshes (Suffolk Wildlife Trust)
 Carn Moor (Cornwall Wildlife Trust)
 Carr House Meadows (Sheffield Wildlife Trust)
 Carr Vale Flash (Derbyshire Wildlife Trust)
 Carron Dam (Scottish Wildlife Trust)
 Carron Glen (Scottish Wildlife Trust)
 Carsegowan Moss (Scottish Wildlife Trust)
 Carstramon Wood (Scottish Wildlife Trust)
 Carvers Rocks (Derbyshire Wildlife Trust)
 Cassiobury Park (Herts & Middlesex Wildlife Trust)
 Castern Wood (Staffordshire Wildlife Trust)
 Castle Marshes (Suffolk Wildlife Trust)
 Castle Woods (The Wildlife Trust for South & West Wales)
 Catcott Complex (Somerset Wildlife Trust)
 Catcott North (Somerset Wildlife Trust)
 Catherington Down (Hampshire & IOW Wildlife Trust)
 Catherton Common (Shropshire Wildlife Trust)
 Cathkin Marsh (Scottish Wildlife Trust)
 Cattersty Gill (Tees Valley Wildlife Trust)
 Cefn Cenarth (Radnorshire Wildlife Trust)
 Cemaes Head (The Wildlife Trust for South & West Wales)
 Cemlyn (North Wales Wildlife Trust)
 Centenary Riverside (Sheffield Wildlife Trust)
 Centre for Wildlife Gardening (London Wildlife Trust)
 Centre of the Earth (The Wildlife Trust for Birmingham and the Black Country)
 Chaceley Meadow (Gloucestershire Wildlife Trust)
 Chaddesley Woods National Nature Reserve (Worcestershire Wildlife Trust)
 Chafer Wood Nature Reserve (Yorkshire Wildlife Trust)
 Chafford Gorges Nature Park (Essex Wildlife Trust)
 Chailey Warren (Sussex Wildlife Trust)
 Chainbridge (Nottinghamshire Wildlife Trust)
 Chance Wood (Worcestershire Wildlife Trust)
 Chancellors Farm (Somerset Wildlife Trust)
 Chapel Bank (London Wildlife Trust)
 Chapel Pit (Lincolnshire Wildlife Trust)
 Chappetts Copse (Hampshire & IOW Wildlife Trust)
 Charfield Meadow (Avon Wildlife Trust)
 Charley Woods (Leicestershire & Rutland Wildlife Trust)
 Charnwood Lodge Nature Reserve (Leicestershire & Rutland Wildlife Trust)
 Chawridge Bank (Berks, Bucks & Oxon Wildlife Trust)
 Cheddar Complex (Somerset Wildlife Trust)
 Cheddar Wood Edge (Somerset Wildlife Trust)
 Chedworth (Gloucestershire Wildlife Trust)
 Chee Dale (Derbyshire Wildlife Trust)
 Cherry Hinton Chalk Pits (The Wildlife Trust for Bedfordshire, Cambridgeshire and Northamptonshire)
 Chettisham Meadow (The Wildlife Trust for Bedfordshire, Cambridgeshire and Northamptonshire)
 Chew Valley Lake (Avon Wildlife Trust)
 Chigborough Lakes (Essex Wildlife Trust)
 Chilton Moor (Somerset Wildlife Trust)
 Chilwell Meadow (Nottinghamshire Wildlife Trust)
 Chimney Meadows (Berks, Bucks & Oxon Wildlife Trust)
 Chinnor Hill (Berks, Bucks & Oxon Wildlife Trust)
 Chinthurst Hill (Surrey Wildlife Trust)
 Chitty's Common (Surrey Wildlife Trust)
 Chobham Common (Surrey Wildlife Trust)
 Cholsey Marsh (Berks, Bucks & Oxon Wildlife Trust)
 Chosen Hill (Gloucestershire Wildlife Trust)
 Christopher Cadbury Reserve (Herefordshire Nature Trust)
 Chudleigh Knighton Heath (Devon Wildlife Trust)
 Chun Downs (Cornwall Wildlife Trust)
 Church Farm (Suffolk Wildlife Trust)
 Churchtown Farm Nature Reserve (Cornwall Wildlife Trust)
 Chyverton (Cornwall Wildlife Trust)
 Clapgate Pits (Lincolnshire Wildlife Trust)
 Clapton Moor (Avon Wildlife Trust)
 Clarborough Tunnel (Nottinghamshire Wildlife Trust)
 Clarke's Pool Meadows (Gloucestershire Wildlife Trust)
 Clattinger Farm (Wiltshire Wildlife Trust)
 Clay Vallets Wood (Herefordshire Nature Trust)
 Claybrookes Marsh (Warwickshire Wildlife Trust)
 Cleaver Heath (Cheshire Wildlife Trust)
 Cleeve Heronry (Avon Wildlife Trust)
 Cley Marshes (Norfolk Wildlife Trust)
 Clifford Common (Herefordshire Nature Trust)
 Clints Quarry Nature Reserve (Cumbria Wildlife Trust)
 Cloatley Meadows (Wiltshire Wildlife Trust)
 Close House Riverside (Northumberland Wildlife Trust)
 Close Sartfield (Manx Wildlife Trust)
 Cloud Wood (Leicestershire & Rutland Wildlife Trust)
 Clouts Wood (Wiltshire Wildlife Trust)
 Clowes Wood and New Fallings Coppice (Warwickshire Wildlife Trust)
 Clunton Coppice (Shropshire Wildlife Trust)
 Coatham Marsh (Tees Valley Wildlife Trust)
 Cock Robin Wood (Warwickshire Wildlife Trust)
 Cockey Down (Wiltshire Wildlife Trust)
 Cockles Fields (Somerset Wildlife Trust)
 Cockshoot Broad (Norfolk Wildlife Trust)
 Coed Barcud (The Wildlife Trust for South & West Wales)
 Coed Cilygroeslwyd (North Wales Wildlife Trust)
 Coed Crafnant (North Wales Wildlife Trust)
 Coed Dyrysiog (Brecknock Wildlife Trust)
 Coed Garnllwyd (The Wildlife Trust for South & West Wales)
 Coed Gawdir (The Wildlife Trust for South & West Wales)
 Coed Llwyn Rhyddid (The Wildlife Trust for South & West Wales)
 Coed Maidie B Goddard (The Wildlife Trust for South & West Wales)
 Coed Meyric Moel (Gwent Wildlife Trust)
 Coed Pendugwm (Montgomeryshire Wildlife Trust)
 Coed Penglanowen (The Wildlife Trust for South & West Wales)
 Coed Pont Pren (The Wildlife Trust for South & West Wales)
 Coed Porthamel (North Wales Wildlife Trust)
 Coed Simdde Lwyd (The Wildlife Trust for South & West Wales)
 Coed Trellyniau (North Wales Wildlife Trust)
 Coed Wern Ddu (The Wildlife Trust for South & West Wales)
 Coed y Bedw (The Wildlife Trust for South & West Wales)
 Coed y Bwl (The Wildlife Trust for South & West Wales)
 Coed y Felin (North Wales Wildlife Trust)
 Colekitchen Down (Surrey Wildlife Trust)
 College Lake (Berks, Bucks & Oxon Wildlife Trust)
 Collin Park Wood (Gloucestershire Wildlife Trust)
 Collingwood (Kent Wildlife Trust)
 Collyer's Brook (Dorset Wildlife Trust)
 Collyweston Quarries (The Wildlife Trust for Bedfordshire, Cambridgeshire and Northamptonshire)
 Colne Point (Essex Wildlife Trust)
 Combs Wood (Suffolk Wildlife Trust)
 Comley Quarry (Shropshire Wildlife Trust)
 Common Hill (Herefordshire Nature Trust)
 Compstall Nature Reserve (Cheshire Wildlife Trust)
 Conigre Mead (Wiltshire Wildlife Trust)
 Cooildarry (Manx Wildlife Trust)
 Cooksbridge Meadow (Sussex Wildlife Trust)
 Coombe Bissett Down (Wiltshire Wildlife Trust)
 Coombe Brook Valley (Avon Wildlife Trust)
 Coombe Heath (Dorset Wildlife Trust)
 Coombe Hill Canal and Meadows (Gloucestershire Wildlife Trust)
 Cooper's Hill (The Wildlife Trust for Bedfordshire, Cambridgeshire and Northamptonshire)
 Cop Lane (The Wildlife Trust for Lancashire, Manchester & north Merseyside)
 Cople Pits (The Wildlife Trust for Bedfordshire, Cambridgeshire and Northamptonshire)
 Copperas Wood (Essex Wildlife Trust)
 Copythorne Common (Hampshire & IOW Wildlife Trust)
 Corfe Mullen Meadow (Dorset Wildlife Trust)
 Cornard Mere (Suffolk Wildlife Trust)
 Cors Bodgynydd (North Wales Wildlife Trust)
 Cors Dyfi (Montgomeryshire Wildlife Trust)
 Cors Goch (North Wales Wildlife Trust)
 Cors Goch (The Wildlife Trust for South & West Wales)
 Cors Ian (The Wildlife Trust for South & West Wales)
 Cors Pum Heol (The Wildlife Trust for South & West Wales)
 Corsehillmuir Wood (Scottish Wildlife Trust)
 Cors-y-Sarnau (North Wales Wildlife Trust)
 Cossington Meadows Nature Reserve (Leicestershire & Rutland Wildlife Trust)
 Cottage Farm (Ulster Wildlife Trust)
 Cotterill Clough (Cheshire Wildlife Trust)
 Cotton Dell (Staffordshire Wildlife Trust)
 Coughton Marsh (Herefordshire Nature Trust)
 Coulters Dean (Hampshire & IOW Wildlife Trust)
 Court Wood (Herefordshire Nature Trust)
 Cowden Pound Pastures (Kent Wildlife Trust)
 Cox's Island (Warwickshire Wildlife Trust)
 Crabtree Ponds (Sheffield Wildlife Trust)
 Crackley Woods (Warwickshire Wildlife Trust)
 Craig Cilhendre Woods (The Wildlife Trust for South & West Wales)
 Craig Sychtyn (Shropshire Wildlife Trust)
 Craig y Rhiwarth (Brecknock Wildlife Trust)
 Cramer Gutter (Shropshire Wildlife Trust)
 Cramside Wood (Derbyshire Wildlife Trust)
 Crane Meadows (London Wildlife Trust)
 Crane Park Island Reserve (London Wildlife Trust)
 Cranham Marsh (Essex Wildlife Trust)
 Cresswell Foreshore (Northumberland Wildlife Trust)
 Cresswell Pond (Northumberland Wildlife Trust)
 Crews Hill Wood (Worcestershire Wildlife Trust)
 Cribb's Meadow National Nature Reserve (Leicestershire & Rutland Wildlife Trust)
 Cricklepit Mill (Devon Wildlife Trust)
 Croes Robert Wood SSSI (Gwent Wildlife Trust)
 Croft Pasture (Leicestershire & Rutland Wildlife Trust)
 Cromers Wood (Kent Wildlife Trust)
 Cromford Canal SSSI (Derbyshire Wildlife Trust)
 Cronk y Bing (Manx Wildlife Trust)
 Crooksbury Hill (Surrey Wildlife Trust)
 Cross Hill Quarry Local Nature Reserve (The Wildlife Trust for Lancashire, Manchester & north Merseyside)
 Crow Wood & Meadow (Herefordshire Nature Trust)
 Crowle Moor (Lincolnshire Wildlife Trust)
 Crowsheath Wood (Essex Wildlife Trust)
 Croxall Lakes (Staffordshire Wildlife Trust)
 CS Lewis Nature Reserve (Berks, Bucks & Oxon Wildlife Trust)
 Cucknells Wood (Surrey Wildlife Trust)
 Cuhere Wood (Gwent Wildlife Trust)
 Cullaloe (Scottish Wildlife Trust)
 Cumbernauld Glen (Scottish Wildlife Trust)
 Curragh Kiondroghad (Manx Wildlife Trust)
 Cutsdean Quarry (Gloucestershire Wildlife Trust)
 Cut-throat Meadow (The Wildlife Trust for Bedfordshire, Cambridgeshire and Northamptonshire)
 Cuttle Pool (Warwickshire Wildlife Trust)
 Cwm Byddog (Radnorshire Wildlife Trust)
 Cwm Claisfer (Brecknock Wildlife Trust)
 Cwm Clettwr (The Wildlife Trust for South & West Wales)
 Cwm Colhuw (The Wildlife Trust for South & West Wales)
 Cwm Oergwm (Brecknock Wildlife Trust)

D

 Dalby Mountain Moorland (Manx Wildlife Trust)
 Dalmellington Moss (Scottish Wildlife Trust)
 Danbury Ridge (Essex Wildlife Trust)
 Dancersend (Berks, Bucks & Oxon Wildlife Trust)
 Danemead (Herts & Middlesex Wildlife Trust)
 Danes Moss (Cheshire Wildlife Trust)
 Daneshill Gravel Pits (Nottinghamshire Wildlife Trust)
 Daneway Banks (Gloucestershire Wildlife Trust)
 Dan-y-Graig (Gwent Wildlife Trust)
 Darland Banks (Kent Wildlife Trust)
 Darren Fawr (Brecknock Wildlife Trust)
 Darsham Marshes (Suffolk Wildlife Trust)
 Dart Valley (Devon Wildlife Trust)
 Daudreath Illtyd (Brecknock Wildlife Trust)
 Davies Meadow (Herefordshire Nature Trust)
 Dawcombe (Surrey Wildlife Trust)
 Dawlish Inner Warren (Devon Wildlife Trust)
 Dawson City Clay Pits (Lincolnshire Wildlife Trust)
 Dean Wood (The Wildlife Trust for Lancashire, Manchester & north Merseyside)
 Deans Green (Warwickshire Wildlife Trust)
 Deborah's Hole (The Wildlife Trust for South & West Wales)
 Decoy Heath (Berks, Bucks & Oxon Wildlife Trust)
 Deep Dale and Topley Pike (Derbyshire Wildlife Trust)
 Deepdene Terrace (Surrey Wildlife Trust)
 Deeping Lakes (Lincolnshire Wildlife Trust)
 Deer's Leap Wood (Wildlife Trust for Birmingham and the Black Country)
 Denaby Ings Nature Reserve (Yorkshire Wildlife Trust) 
 Denham Lock Wood (London Wildlife Trust)
 Denton Bank (Kent Wildlife Trust)
 Derwentside (Derbyshire Wildlife Trust)
 Devichoys Wood (Cornwall Wildlife Trust)
 Dew's Farm Sand Pits (London Wildlife Trust)
 Digby Corner (Lincolnshire Wildlife Trust)
 Dimminsdale (Leicestershire & Rutland Wildlife Trust)
 Dingle Marshes (Suffolk Wildlife Trust)
 Distillery Meadows (Wiltshire Wildlife Trust)
 Ditchford Lakes and Meadows (The Wildlife Trust for Bedfordshire, Cambridgeshire and Northamptonshire)
 Ditchling Beacon (Sussex Wildlife Trust)
 Dixton Embankment (Gwent Wildlife Trust)
 Doghouse Grove (The Wildlife Trust for Bedfordshire, Cambridgeshire and Northamptonshire)
 Dogsthorpe Star Pit (The Wildlife Trust for Bedfordshire, Cambridgeshire and Northamptonshire)
 Dole Wood (Lincolnshire Wildlife Trust)
 Dolebury Warren (Avon Wildlife Trust)
 Dolforwyn Woods (Montgomeryshire Wildlife Trust)
 Dolgoch quarry, Shropshire (Shropshire Wildlife Trust)
 Dollypers Hill (Surrey Wildlife Trust)
 Dolydd Hafren (Montgomeryshire Wildlife Trust)
 Dommett Wood (Somerset Wildlife Trust)
 Donna Nook NNR (Lincolnshire Wildlife Trust)
 Dorothy Farrer's Spring Wood (Cumbria Wildlife Trust)
 Dougie's Pond (Northumberland Wildlife Trust)
 Downe Bank (Kent Wildlife Trust)
 Downhill Meadow (Cornwall Wildlife Trust)
 Dowrog Common (The Wildlife Trust for South & West Wales)
 Doxey Marshes (Staffordshire Wildlife Trust)
 Drake Street Meadow (Worcestershire Wildlife Trust)
 Drakelow (Derbyshire Wildlife Trust)
 Draycote Meadows (Warwickshire Wildlife Trust)
 Draycott Sleights (Somerset Wildlife Trust)
 Droitwich Community Woods (Worcestershire Wildlife Trust)
 Dropshort Marsh (The Wildlife Trust for Bedfordshire, Cambridgeshire and Northamptonshire)
 Drostre Wood (Brecknock Wildlife Trust)
 Drumburgh Moss Nature Reserve (Cumbria Wildlife Trust)
 Drummains Reedbed (Scottish Wildlife Trust)
 Druridge Pools (Northumberland Wildlife Trust)
 Dry Sandford Pit (Berks, Bucks & Oxon Wildlife Trust)
 Dubbs Moss Nature Reserve (Cumbria Wildlife Trust)
 Duckmanton Railway Cutting (Derbyshire Wildlife Trust)
 Duke of York Meadow (Worcestershire Wildlife Trust)
 Duke's Covert & Copper Hill (Lincolnshire Wildlife Trust)
 Dukes Wood Nature Reserve (Nottinghamshire Wildlife Trust)
 Dumbarnie Links (Scottish Wildlife Trust)
 Dundon Beacon (Somerset Wildlife Trust)
 Duns Castle (Scottish Wildlife Trust)
 Dunsdon National Nature Reserve (Devon Wildlife Trust)
 Dunsford (Devon Wildlife Trust)
 Dunwich Forest (Suffolk Wildlife Trust)
 Dutton Farm Park (Cheshire Wildlife Trust)
 Dyfnant Meadows (Montgomeryshire Wildlife Trust)
 Dyscarr Wood (Nottinghamshire Wildlife Trust)

E

 Eaglehead and Bloodstone Copses (Hampshire & IOW Wildlife Trust)
 Eakring Meadow (Nottinghamshire Wildlife Trust)
 Earl's Hill (Shropshire Wildlife Trust)
 Earlswood Moathouse (Warwickshire Wildlife Trust)
 Earystane (Manx Wildlife Trust)
 East Blean Wood NNR (Kent Wildlife Trust)
 East Chevington (Northumberland Wildlife Trust)
 East Cramlington Pond (Northumberland Wildlife Trust)
 East Crindledykes Quarry (Northumberland Wildlife Trust)
 East Lammermuir Deans (Scottish Wildlife Trust)
 East Reservoir Community Garden (London Wildlife Trust)
 East Stoke Fen (Dorset Wildlife Trust)
 East Winch Common (Norfolk Wildlife Trust)
 East Wood (Gloucestershire Wildlife Trust)
 East Wretham Heath (Norfolk Wildlife Trust)
 Eastfield Road Railway Embankment (Lincolnshire Wildlife Trust)
 Eastwood Nature Reserve (Cheshire Wildlife Trust)
 Eathorpe Marsh (Warwickshire Wildlife Trust)
 Eaton & Gamston Woods (Nottinghamshire Wildlife Trust)
 Ebernoe Common (Sussex Wildlife Trust)
 Echo Lodge Meadows (Wiltshire Wildlife Trust)
 ECOS (Ulster Wildlife Trust)
 Edford Meadows (Somerset Wildlife Trust)
 Edford Wood (Somerset Wildlife Trust)
 Edgehills Bog (Gloucestershire Wildlife Trust)
 Edmondsley Wood (Durham Wildlife Trust)
 Edward Richardson & Phyllis Amey (Gloucestershire Wildlife Trust)
 Elizabeth & Rowe Harding Reserve (The Wildlife Trust for South & West Wales)
 Ellerburn Bank Nature Reserve (Yorkshire Wildlife Trust)
 Elliott (Swift's Hill) (Gloucestershire Wildlife Trust)
 Elmdon Manor (Warwickshire Wildlife Trust)
 Emer Bog and Baddesley Common (Hampshire & IOW Wildlife Trust)
 Emmett Hill Meadows (Wiltshire Wildlife Trust)
 Emsworthy mire (Devon Wildlife Trust)
 Epworth Turbary (Lincolnshire Wildlife Trust)
 Erewash Meadows (Derbyshire Wildlife Trust) 
 Erewash Meadows (Nottinghamshire Wildlife Trust)
 Eridge Rocks (Sussex Wildlife Trust)
 Ernle Gilbert Meadow (Herefordshire Nature Trust)
 Erraid Wood (Scottish Wildlife Trust)
 Eskmeals Dunes Nature Reserve (Cumbria Wildlife Trust) 
 Evelyn Howick Memorial, Littlemill (Northumberland Wildlife Trust)
 Ewerby Pond (Lincolnshire Wildlife Trust)
 Exe Reed Beds (Devon Wildlife Trust)
 Exeter Valley Parks (Devon Wildlife Trust)
 Eye Green Brick Pit (The Wildlife Trust for Bedfordshire, Cambridgeshire and Northamptonshire)

F

 Fackenden Down (Kent Wildlife Trust)
 Fairfield Pit (Lincolnshire Wildlife Trust)
 Fairham Brook (Nottinghamshire Wildlife Trust)
 Far Ings National Nature Reserve (Lincolnshire Wildlife Trust)
 Farthinghoe (The Wildlife Trust for Bedfordshire, Cambridgeshire and Northamptonshire)
 Finedon Cally Banks (The Wildlife Trust for Bedfordshire, Cambridgeshire and Northamptonshire)
 Fir and Pond Woods (Herts and Middlesex Wildlife Trust)
 Fir Hill Quarry (Lincolnshire Wildlife Trust)
 Fiskerton Fen (Lincolnshire Wildlife Trust)
 Fleetwood Marsh (The Wildlife Trust for Lancashire, Manchester & north Merseyside)
 Flexford (Hampshire & IOW Wildlife Trust)
 Flitwick Moor (& Folly Wood) (The Wildlife Trust for Bedfordshire, Cambridgeshire and Northamptonshire)
 Flodden Quarry (Northumberland Wildlife Trust)
 Fobbing Marsh (Essex Wildlife Trust)
 Folly Farm (Avon Wildlife Trust)
 Fontburn (Northumberland Wildlife Trust)
 Fontmell Down (Dorset Wildlife Trust)
 Ford Moss (Northumberland Wildlife Trust)
 Fordham Woods (The Wildlife Trust for Bedfordshire, Cambridgeshire and Northamptonshire)
 Forest Wood (Scottish Wildlife Trust)
 Foster's Green Meadows (Worcestershire Wildlife Trust)
 Foulney Island Nature Reserve (Cumbria Wildlife Trust)
 Foulshaw Moss (Cumbria Wildlife Trust)
 Fountainbleau Ladypark (Scottish Wildlife Trust)
 Fowls Copse (Surrey Wildlife Trust) 
 Fox Corner (Cornwall Wildlife Trust)
 Fox Covert (Herts & Middlesex Wildlife Trust)
 Fox Fritillary Meadow (Suffolk Wildlife Trust) 
 Fox Hagg (Sheffield Wildlife Trust)
 Fox Wood (London Wildlife Trust)
 Foxburrow Farm (Suffolk Wildlife Trust)
 Foxcovert Plantation (Nottinghamshire Wildlife Trust)
 Foxes Bridge Bog (Gloucestershire Wildlife Trust)
 Foxes Wood (Cheshire Wildlife Trust)
 Foxhill Bank Local Nature Reserve (The Wildlife Trust for Lancashire, Manchester & north Merseyside)
 Foxholes (Berks, Bucks & Oxon Wildlife Trust)
 Foxlease Meadows (Hampshire & IOW Wildlife Trust)
 Foxley Wood (Norfolk Wildlife Trust)
 Frampton Marsh (Lincolnshire Wildlife Trust)
 Fraser Down (Surrey Wildlife Trust)
 Fray's Farm Meadows (London Wildlife Trust)
 Fray's Island and Mabey's Meadow (London Wildlife Trust)
 Freemans Pasture Local Nature Reserve (The Wildlife Trust for Lancashire, Manchester & north Merseyside)
 Freeman's Pools (The Wildlife Trust for Lancashire, Manchester & north Merseyside)
 Freshfield Dune Heath (The Wildlife Trust for Lancashire, Manchester & north Merseyside)
 Friskney Decoy Wood (Lincolnshire Wildlife Trust)
 Frith Wood (Gloucestershire Wildlife Trust)
 Frodsham Field Studies Centre (Cheshire Wildlife Trust)
 Frogmore Meadow (Herts & Middlesex Wildlife Trust)
 Frome Banks (Gloucestershire Wildlife Trust)
 Fulbourn Fen (The Wildlife Trust for Bedfordshire, Cambridgeshire and Northamptonshire)
 Furze Hill (Lincolnshire Wildlife Trust)

G

 Gailes Marsh (Scottish Wildlife Trust)
 Gamlingay Cinques and Meadow (The Wildlife Trust for Bedfordshire, Cambridgeshire and Northamptonshire)
 Gamlingay Wood (The Wildlife Trust for Bedfordshire, Cambridgeshire and Northamptonshire)
 Gamsey Wood (The Wildlife Trust for Bedfordshire, Cambridgeshire and Northamptonshire)
 Gang Mine (Derbyshire Wildlife Trust)
 Garbutt Wood Nature Reserve (Yorkshire Wildlife Trust)
 Garne Turn Rocks (The Wildlife Trust for South & West Wales)
 Garnock Floods (Scottish Wildlife Trust)
 Garrion Gill (Scottish Wildlife Trust)
 GB Gruffy (Somerset Wildlife Trust)
 Gelli Hir (The Wildlife Trust for South & West Wales)
 George's Hayes (Staffordshire Wildlife Trust)
 Gernon Bushes (Essex Wildlife Trust)
 Gibraltar Point National Nature Reserve (Lincolnshire Wildlife Trust)
 Gight Wood (Scottish Wildlife Trust)
 Gilfach Farm (Radnorshire Wildlife Trust)
 Gillham Wood (Sussex Wildlife Trust)
 Gilling Down (Somerset Wildlife Trust)
 Girdlers Coppice (Dorset Wildlife Trust)
 Glapthorn Cow Pastures (The Wildlife Trust for Bedfordshire, Cambridgeshire and Northamptonshire)
 Glapton Wood (Nottinghamshire Wildlife Trust)
 Glasbury Cutting (Brecknock Wildlife Trust)
 Glaslyn (Montgomeryshire Wildlife Trust)
 Glasshouse Spinney (Warwickshire Wildlife Trust)
 Glen Dhoo (Manx Wildlife Trust)
 Glen Moss (Scottish Wildlife Trust)
 Glenarm (Ulster Wildlife Trust)
 Glendun Farm (Ulster Wildlife Trust)
 Globe Flower Wood Nature Reserve (Yorkshire Wildlife Trust)
 Glory Wood (Surrey Wildlife Trust)
 Glyme Valley (Berks, Bucks & Oxon Wildlife Trust)
 Gobions Wood (Herts & Middlesex Wildlife Trust)
 Goblin Combe (Avon Wildlife Trust)
 Gogarth (North Wales Wildlife Trust)
 Golden Brook Storage Lagoon (Derbyshire Wildlife Trust)
 Goldicote Cutting (Warwickshire Wildlife Trust)
 Gomm Valley (Berks, Bucks & Oxon Wildlife Trust)
 Goodwick Moor (The Wildlife Trust for South & West Wales)
 Goose's Nest Bluebell Bank (Northumberland Wildlife Trust)
 Gordon Moss (Scottish Wildlife Trust)
 Gors Maen Llwyd (North Wales Wildlife Trust)
 Gorse Farm (Radnorshire Wildlife Trust)
 Gosling Sike Farm (Cumbria Wildlife Trust)
 Goslings Corner Wood (Lincolnshire Wildlife Trust)
 Gowy Meadows (Cheshire Wildlife Trust)
 Gracious Pond (Surrey Wildlife Trust)
 Graeme Hendrey Wood (Surrey Wildlife Trust)
 Graffham Common (Sussex Wildlife Trust)
 Grafham Water (The Wildlife Trust for Bedfordshire, Cambridgeshire and Northamptonshire)
 Grafton Wood (Worcestershire Wildlife Trust)
 Graig Wood (Gwent Wildlife Trust)
 Granville Nature Reserve and Country Park (Shropshire Wildlife Trust)
 Grass Wood Nature Reserve (Yorkshire Wildlife Trust)
 Grasslees Burn Wood (Northumberland Wildlife Trust)
 Gravel Hole (Tees Valley Wildlife Trust)
 Great Breach Wood (Somerset Wildlife Trust)
 Great Casterton Road Banks (Lincolnshire Wildlife Trust)
 Great Fen (The Wildlife Trust for Bedfordshire, Cambridgeshire and Northamptonshire)
 Great Holland pits (Essex Wildlife Trust)
 Great Merrible Wood (Leicestershire & Rutland Wildlife Trust)
 Great Oakley Meadow (The Wildlife Trust for Bedfordshire, Cambridgeshire and Northamptonshire)
 Green Down (Somerset Wildlife Trust)
 Green Lane Wood (Wiltshire Wildlife Trust)
 Greena Moor (Creddacott Meadows) (Cornwall Wildlife Trust)
 Greenfields (Shropshire Wildlife Trust)
 Greenhill Down (Dorset Wildlife Trust)
 Greenlee Lough (Northumberland Wildlife Trust)
 Greetwell Hollow (Lincolnshire Wildlife Trust)
 Greno Woods (Sheffield Wildlife Trust)
 Greville Place Reserve (London Wildlife Trust)
 Grey Hill Grassland (Scottish Wildlife Trust)
 Greylynch (Somerset Wildlife Trust)
 Greystones Farm (Gloucestershire Wildlife Trust)
 Greywell Moors (Hampshire & IOW Wildlife Trust)
 Grimley Brick Pits (Worcestershire Wildlife Trust)
 Grimston Warren (Norfolk Wildlife Trust)
 Grindon Lough (Northumberland Wildlife Trust)
 Groton Wood (Suffolk Wildlife Trust)
 Grove Farm (Suffolk Wildlife Trust)
 Grove Hill (Warwickshire Wildlife Trust)
 Grovely Dingle (Worcestershire Wildlife Trust)
 Grubbins Wood Nature Reserve (Cumbria Wildlife Trust)
 Gun Moor (Staffordshire Wildlife Trust)
 Gunnersbury Triangle Nature Reserve (London Wildlife Trust)
 Gunton Meadow (Suffolk Wildlife Trust)
 Gutteridge Wood (London Wildlife Trust)
 Gwaith Powdwr (North Wales Wildlife Trust)
 Gwen and Vera's Fields (Gloucestershire Wildlife Trust)

H

 Hackhurst Downs (Surrey Wildlife Trust)
 Hadfast Valley (Scottish Wildlife Trust)
 Hadfields Quarry (Derbyshire Wildlife Trust)
 Hagbourne Copse (Wiltshire Wildlife Trust)
 Halbullock Moor (Cornwall Wildlife Trust)
 Hale Moss Nature Reserve (Cumbria Wildlife Trust)
 Halsdon (Devon Wildlife Trust)
 Halwill Junction (Devon Wildlife Trust)
 Ham Fen (Kent Wildlife Trust)
 Ham Hill (Wiltshire Wildlife Trust)
 Hambury Wood (The Wildlife Trust for South & West Wales)
 Hammond's Field Redmires Nature Reserve (Yorkshire Wildlife Trust)
 Hampton Meadow (Herefordshire Nature Trust)
 Hampton Wood & Meadow (Warwickshire Wildlife Trust)
 Handa Island (Scottish Wildlife Trust)
 Hanley Dingle (Worcestershire Wildlife Trust)
 Hannah's Meadow (Durham Wildlife Trust)
 Hanningfield Reservoir (Essex Wildlife Trust)
 Harbottle Crags (Northumberland Wildlife Trust)
 Harbury Spoilbank (Warwickshire Wildlife Trust)
 Hardwick Dene & Elm Tree Wood (Tees Valley Wildlife Trust)
 Hardwick Wood (The Wildlife Trust for Bedfordshire, Cambridgeshire and Northamptonshire)
 Hare and Dunhog Mosses (Scottish Wildlife Trust)
 Harland Mount Nature Reserve (Yorkshire Wildlife Trust)
 Harlestone Heath (The Wildlife Trust for Bedfordshire, Cambridgeshire and Northamptonshire)
 Harridge Wood (Somerset Wildlife Trust)
 Harrisons Plantation Nature Reserve (Nottinghamshire Wildlife Trust)
 Harston Wood (Staffordshire Wildlife Trust)
 Hartington Meadows (Derbyshire Wildlife Trust)
 Harton Hollow (Shropshire Wildlife Trust)
 Hartslock (Berks, Bucks & Oxon Wildlife Trust)
 Harvest Hill (Warwickshire Wildlife Trust)
 Haskayne Cutting Nature Reserve (The Wildlife Trust for Lancashire, Manchester & north Merseyside)
 Hatch Mere (Cheshire Wildlife Trust)
 Hatton Meadows (Lincolnshire Wildlife Trust)
 Hauxley (Northumberland Wildlife Trust)
 Hawkes Wood (Cornwall Wildlife Trust)
 Hawkins Wood (Herts & Middlesex Wildlife Trust)
 Hawkswood (Devon Wildlife Trust)
 Hawthorn Dene (Durham Wildlife Trust)
 Haxey Turbary (Lincolnshire Wildlife Trust)
 Haydon Hill (Dorset Wildlife Trust)
 Hayley Wood (The Wildlife Trust for Bedfordshire, Cambridgeshire and Northamptonshire)
 Haymill Valley (Berks, Bucks & Oxon Wildlife Trust)
 Hazlewood Marshes (Suffolk Wildlife Trust)
 Headley Gravel Pit (Hampshire & IOW Wildlife Trust)
 Heath's Meadows (Lincolnshire Wildlife Trust)
 Hedgecourt (Surrey Wildlife Trust)
 Hedleyhope Fell (Durham Wildlife Trust)
 Hellenge Hill (Avon Wildlife Trust)
 Helman Tor (Cornwall Wildlife Trust)
 Hem Heath Woods (Staffordshire Wildlife Trust)
 Hen Reedbed (Suffolk Wildlife Trust)
 Hendover Coppice (Dorset Wildlife Trust)
 Henley Sidings (Warwickshire Wildlife Trust)
 Henllys Bog SSSI (Alderney Wildlife Trust)
 Henllys Bog SSSI (Gwent Wildlife Trust)
 Hermand Birchwood (Scottish Wildlife Trust)
 Hertford Heath (Herts & Middlesex Wildlife Trust)
 Hesleden Dene (Durham Wildlife Trust)
 Hetchell Wood Nature Reserve (Yorkshire Wildlife Trust)
 Hethel Old Thorn (Norfolk Wildlife Trust)
 Hewitt's Chalk Bank (Kent Wildlife Trust)
 Hexton Chalk Pit (Herts & Middlesex Wildlife Trust)
 Heysham Moss (The Wildlife Trust for Lancashire, Manchester & north Merseyside)
 Heysham Nature Reserve (The Wildlife Trust for Lancashire, Manchester & north Merseyside)
 Hibbitt Woods (Dorset Wildlife Trust)
 Hickling Broad (Norfolk Wildlife Trust)
 High Clear Down (Wiltshire Wildlife Trust)
 High Wood (Durham Wildlife Trust)
 High Wood and Meadow (The Wildlife Trust for Bedfordshire, Cambridgeshire and Northamptonshire)
 Higham Ferrers Pits (The Wildlife Trust for Bedfordshire, Cambridgeshire and Northamptonshire)
 Higher Hyde Heath (Dorset Wildlife Trust)
 Higher Kiln Quarry (Devon Wildlife Trust)
 Highgate Common (Staffordshire Wildlife Trust)
 Hilfield Park Reservoir (Herts & Middlesex Wildlife Trust)
 Hill Court Farm & The Blacklands (Worcestershire Wildlife Trust)
 Hill End Pit (Herts & Middlesex Wildlife Trust)
 Hill Hook (The Wildlife Trust for Birmingham and the Black Country)
 Hill of White Hamars (Scottish Wildlife Trust)
 Hill Park (Surrey Wildlife Trust)
 Hillbridge and Park Wood (Derbyshire Wildlife Trust)
 Hilton Gravel Pits (Derbyshire Wildlife Trust)
 Hitchcopse Pit (Berks, Bucks & Oxon Wildlife Trust)
 Hobbs Quarry (Gloucestershire Wildlife Trust)
 Hobnole Bank (Lincolnshire Wildlife Trust)
 Hockenhull Platts (Cheshire Wildlife Trust)
 Hodgson's Fields Nature Reserve (Yorkshire Wildlife Trust)
 Hoe Rough (Norfolk Wildlife Trust)
 Hogswood Covert (Cheshire Wildlife Trust)
 Holborough Marshes (Kent Wildlife Trust)
 Holburn Moss (Northumberland Wildlife Trust)
 Holcroft Moss (Cheshire Wildlife Trust)
 Holford Ketling (Somerset Wildlife Trust)
 Hollinhill and Markland Grips (Derbyshire Wildlife Trust)
 Hollow Marsh Meadow (Somerset Wildlife Trust)
 Holly Banks (Shropshire Wildlife Trust)
 Holly Wood (Derbyshire Wildlife Trust)
 Hollybed Farm Meadows (Worcestershire Wildlife Trust)
 Holme Dunes (Norfolk Wildlife Trust)
 Holway Woods (Dorset Wildlife Trust)
 Holwell Mineral Line (Leicestershire & Rutland Wildlife Trust)
 Holystone Burn (Northumberland Wildlife Trust)
 Holystone North Wood (Northumberland Wildlife Trust)
 Holywell Dingle (Herefordshire Nature Trust)
 Holywell Pond (Northumberland Wildlife Trust)
 Homefield Wood (Berks, Bucks & Oxon Wildlife Trust)
 Honeypot Wood (Norfolk Wildlife Trust)
 Hookheath Meadows (Hampshire & IOW Wildlife Trust)
 Hook Norton Cutting (Berks, Bucks & Oxon Wildlife Trust)
 Hope Valley (Shropshire Wildlife Trust)
 Hoplands Wood (Lincolnshire Wildlife Trust)
 Hopton Fen (Suffolk Wildlife Trust)
 Hopton Quarry (Derbyshire Wildlife Trust)
 Hopyard Haymeadow Nature Reserve (Yorkshire Wildlife Trust)
 Horbling Line (Lincolnshire Wildlife Trust)
 Horndon Meadow (Essex Wildlife Trust)
 Hornhill Wood (Worcestershire Wildlife Trust)
 Horsehill Coppice (Somerset Wildlife Trust)
 Hoselaw Loch and Din Moss (Scottish Wildlife Trust)
 Hothfield Heathlands (Kent Wildlife Trust)
 Houghton Meadows (The Wildlife Trust for Bedfordshire, Cambridgeshire and Northamptonshire)
 Howell Hill (Surrey Wildlife Trust)
 Huish Moor (Somerset Wildlife Trust)
 Hummersea (Tees Valley Wildlife Trust)
 Humphrey Head Nature Reserve (Cumbria Wildlife Trust)
 Humpy Meadow (Worcestershire Wildlife Trust)
 Hungerford Marsh (Berks, Bucks & Oxon Wildlife Trust)
 Hunningham Meadow (Warwickshire Wildlife Trust)
 Hunsdon and Eastwick Meads (Herts & Middlesex Wildlife Trust)
 Hunsdon Mead (Essex Wildlife Trust)
 Hunt Cliff (Tees Valley Wildlife Trust)
 Hunter's Wood (Cheshire Wildlife Trust)
 Hunthouse Wood (Worcestershire Wildlife Trust)
 Hunt's Meadow (Nottinghamshire Wildlife Trust)
 Hurley Chalk Pit (Berks, Bucks & Oxon Wildlife Trust)
 Hutchinson's Bank Nature Reserve (London Wildlife Trust)
 Hutchinson's Meadow (Suffolk Wildlife Trust)
 Huttoft Bank Pit (Lincolnshire Wildlife Trust)
 Hutton Roof Crags National Nature Reserve (Cumbria Wildlife Trust)
 Hythe Spartina Marsh (Hampshire & IOW Wildlife Trust)

I

 Ickenham Manor Moat (London Wildlife Trust)
 Ickenham Marsh (London Wildlife Trust)
 Idle Valley (Nottinghamshire Wildlife Trust)
 Iffley Meadows (Berks, Bucks & Oxon Wildlife Trust)
 Inholms Claypit (Surrey Wildlife Trust)
 Inishargy Bog (Ulster Wildlife Trust) 
 Inishcreagh (Ulster Wildlife Trust)
 Inkpen Common (Berks, Bucks & Oxon Wildlife Trust)
 Inkpen Crocus Fields (Berks, Bucks & Oxon Wildlife Trust)
 Intake Wood (Cheshire Wildlife Trust)
 Iping and Stedham Commons (Sussex Wildlife Trust)
 Ipsley Alders Marsh (Worcestershire Wildlife Trust)
 Ipstones Edge (Staffordshire Wildlife Trust)
 Iron Latch (Essex Wildlife Trust)
 Irthlingborough Lakes and Meadows (The Wildlife Trust for Bedfordshire, Cambridgeshire and Northamptonshire) 
 Isle Namanfin (Ulster Wildlife Trust)
 Isle of Eigg (Scottish Wildlife Trust)
 Isle of Muck (Ulster Wildlife Trust)
 Isles of Scilly (Isles of Scilly Wildlife Trust)
 Isleworth Ait (London Wildlife Trust)
 Ivy Crag Wood (Cumbria Wildlife Trust)
 Ivy Hatch (Kent Wildlife Trust)

J

 Jacksdale (Nottinghamshire Wildlife Trust)
 Jackson's Coppice & Marsh (Staffordshire Wildlife Trust)
 Jan Hobbs (Somerset Wildlife Trust)
 Jeffry Bog Nature Reserve (Yorkshire Wildlife Trust)
 Joe's Pond (Durham Wildlife Trust)
 John Weston (Essex Wildlife Trust)
 Johnston Terrace Garden (Scottish Wildlife Trust)
 Jones' Rough (Shropshire Wildlife Trust)
 Jones's Mill (Wiltshire Wildlife Trust)
 Juliet's Wood (Northumberland Wildlife Trust)
 Jupiter Urban Wildlife Centre (Scottish Wildlife Trust)

K 

 Keal Carr (Lincolnshire Wildlife Trust)
 Keldmarsh Nature Reserve (Yorkshire Wildlife Trust)
 Kelham Bridge (Leicestershire & Rutland Wildlife Trust)
 Keltneyburn (Scottish Wildlife Trust)
 Kemsing Down (Kent Wildlife Trust)
 Kemyel Crease (Cornwall Wildlife Trust)
 Kenilworth Common (Warwickshire Wildlife Trust)
 Kennall Vale (Cornwall Wildlife Trust)
 Ketford Banks (Gloucestershire Wildlife Trust)
 Ketton Quarry (Leicestershire & Rutland Wildlife Trust)
 Lymington and Keyhaven Marshes (Hampshire & IOW Wildlife Trust)
 Killay Marsh (The Wildlife Trust for South & West Wales)
 Killingholme Haven Pits (Lincolnshire Wildlife Trust)
 Killwood Coppice and Meadows (Dorset Wildlife Trust)
 Kilminning Coast (Scottish Wildlife Trust)
 Kiln Wood (Kent Wildlife Trust)
 Kilvrough Manor Woods & Redden Hill (The Wildlife Trust for South & West Wales)
 Kimberley Cutting (Nottinghamshire Wildlife Trust)
 King Arthur's Cave (Herefordshire Nature Trust)
 King Barrow Quarry (Dorset Wildlife Trust)
 Kingcombe Meadows (Dorset Wildlife Trust)
 Kingerby Beck Meadows (Lincolnshire Wildlife Trust)
 King's Castle Wood (Somerset Wildlife Trust)
 Kings Hill Gully (Somerset Wildlife Trust)
 Kings Lane Community Orchard (Dorset Wildlife Trust)
 King's Meadow (Nottinghamshire Wildlife Trust)
 King's Meads (Herts & Middlesex Wildlife Trust)
 King's Wood (The Wildlife Trust for Bedfordshire, Cambridgeshire and Northamptonshire)
 King's Wood and Rammamere Heath (The Wildlife Trust for Bedfordshire, Cambridgeshire and Northamptonshire)
 Kingsthorpe Meadow (The Wildlife Trust for Bedfordshire, Cambridgeshire and Northamptonshire)
 Kingsway (Herefordshire Nature Trust)
 Kintbury Newt Ponds (Berks, Bucks & Oxon Wildlife Trust)
 Kiplingcotes Nature Reserve (Yorkshire Wildlife Trust)
 Kippax Meadows (Yorkshire Wildlife Trust)
 Kirkby Gravel Pit (Lincolnshire Wildlife Trust)
 Kirkby Moor (Lincolnshire Wildlife Trust)
 Kirkstall Valley Nature Reserve (Yorkshire Wildlife Trust)
 Kirton Wood (Nottinghamshire Wildlife Trust)
 Kitchen Copse (Surrey Wildlife Trust)
 Kitty's Orchard (Gwent Wildlife Trust)
 Knapp and Papermill (Worcestershire Wildlife Trust)
 Knapdale Habitats Partnership Area (Scottish Wildlife Trust)
 Knettishall Heath (Suffolk Wildlife Trust)
 Knockshinnoch Lagoons (Scottish Wildlife Trust)
 Knowetop Lochs (Scottish Wildlife Trust)
 Knowle Hill (Warwickshire Wildlife Trust)
 Knowles Coppice (Worcestershire Wildlife Trust)
 Knutsford Heath (Cheshire Wildlife Trust)
 Knutsford Moor (Cheshire Wildlife Trust)

L

 Lackford Lakes (Suffolk Wildlife Trust)
 Lady Lee Quarry (Nottinghamshire Wildlife Trust)
 Ladybower Wood (Derbyshire Wildlife Trust)
 Lady's Wood (Devon Wildlife Trust)
 Lady's Wood (The Wildlife Trust for Bedfordshire, Cambridgeshire and Northamptonshire)
 Laight Rough (Worcestershire Wildlife Trust)
 Lamb's Pool (Berks, Bucks & Oxon Wildlife Trust)
 Lancaut (Gloucestershire Wildlife Trust)
 Lancot Meadow (The Wildlife Trust for Bedfordshire, Cambridgeshire and Northamptonshire)
 Landford Bog (Wiltshire Wildlife Trust)
 Landpark wood (The Wildlife Trust for Bedfordshire, Cambridgeshire and Northamptonshire)
 Langdon Nature Reserve (Essex Wildlife Trust)
 Langford Heathfield (Somerset Wildlife Trust)
 Langford Lakes (Wiltshire Wildlife Trust)
 Langholme Wood (Lincolnshire Wildlife Trust)
 Lanvean Bottoms (Cornwall Wildlife Trust)
 Largiebaan (Scottish Wildlife Trust)
 Lashford Lane Fen (Berks, Bucks & Oxon Wildlife Trust)
 Latterbarrow Nature Reserve (Cumbria Wildlife Trust)
 Lattersey (The Wildlife Trust for Bedfordshire, Cambridgeshire and Northamptonshire)
 Launde Big Wood (Leicestershire & Rutland Wildlife Trust)
 Launde Park Wood (Leicestershire & Rutland Wildlife Trust)
 Lavernock (The Wildlife Trust for South & West Wales)
 Lawn Wood and Meadows (Lincolnshire Wildlife Trust)
 Lawrence Weston Moor (Avon Wildlife Trust)
 Lawthorn Wood (Scottish Wildlife Trust)
 Laymoor Quag (Gloucestershire Wildlife Trust)
 Lea & Paget's Wood (Alderney Wildlife Trust)
 Lea Meadows (Leicestershire & Rutland Wildlife Trust)
 Lea Wood (Derbyshire Wildlife Trust)
 Leam Valley (Warwickshire Wildlife Trust)
 Ledgers Wood (Surrey Wildlife Trust)
 Ledston Luck (Yorkshire Wildlife Trust)
 Leeping Stocks (Herefordshire Nature Trust)
 Legbourne Wood (Lincolnshire Wildlife Trust)
 Lemsford Springs (Herts & Middlesex Wildlife Trust)
 Letchmire Pastures (Yorkshire Wildlife Trust)
 Letcombe Valley (Berks, Bucks & Oxon Wildlife Trust)
 Levin Down (Sussex Wildlife Trust)
 Levington Lagoon (Suffolk Wildlife Trust)
 Lexden Gathering Grounds (Essex Wildlife Trust)
 Leyburn Old Glebe Nature Reserve (Yorkshire Wildlife Trust)
 Leythorne Meadow (Sussex Wildlife Trust)
 Lickham Common (Devon Wildlife Trust)
 Lielowan Meadow (Scottish Wildlife Trust)
 Limekiln Wood (Cheshire Wildlife Trust)
 Lings (The Wildlife Trust for Bedfordshire, Cambridgeshire and Northamptonshire)
 Linhouse Glen (Scottish Wildlife Trust)
 Linn Dean (Scottish Wildlife Trust)
 Linton Lane (Northumberland Wildlife Trust)
 Linwood (Hampshire & IOW Wildlife Trust)
 Linwood Warren (Lincolnshire Wildlife Trust)
 Lion Creek and Lower Raypits (Essex Wildlife Trust)
 Lion Wood (Warwickshire Wildlife Trust)
 Lion Wood (Worcestershire Wildlife Trust)
 Lippets Grove (Gloucestershire Wildlife Trust)
 Little Beck Wood Nature Reserve (Yorkshire Wildlife Trust)
 Little Bradley Ponds (Devon Wildlife Trust)
 Little Harle Pasture (Northumberland Wildlife Trust)
 Little Haven (Essex Wildlife Trust)
 Little Langford Down (Wiltshire Wildlife Trust)
 Little Linford Wood (Berks, Bucks & Oxon Wildlife Trust)
 Little Waltham Meadows (Essex Wildlife Trust)
 Littlefield Common (Surrey Wildlife Trust)
 Littleton Brick Pits (Avon Wildlife Trust)
 Llanbwchllyn Lake (Radnorshire Wildlife Trust)
 Llandefaelog Wood (Brecknock Wildlife Trust)
 Llandinam Gravels (Montgomeryshire Wildlife Trust)
 Llanerch Alder Carr (The Wildlife Trust for South & West Wales
 Llangloffan Fen (The Wildlife Trust for South & West Wales)
 Llanmerewig Glebe (Montgomeryshire Wildlife Trust)
 Llannerch Alder Carr (The Wildlife Trust for South & West Wales)
 Llanrhidian Hill (The Wildlife Trust for South & West Wales)
 Llanymynech Rocks (Montgomeryshire Wildlife Trust)
 Llanymynech Rocks (Shropshire Wildlife Trust)
 Llyn Coed y Dinas (Montgomeryshire Wildlife Trust)
 Llyn Eiddwen (The Wildlife Trust for South & West Wales)
 Llyn Fanod (The Wildlife Trust for South & West Wales)
 Llyn Mawr (Montgomeryshire Wildlife Trust)
 Llynclys Common (Shropshire Wildlife Trust)
 Loch Ardinning (Scottish Wildlife Trust)
 Loch Fleet (Scottish Wildlife Trust)
 Loch Libo (Scottish Wildlife Trust)
 Loch of Lintrathen (Scottish Wildlife Trust)
 Loch of the Lowes (Scottish Wildlife Trust)
 Lock Lane Ash Tip (Derbyshire Wildlife Trust)
 Lockley Lodge Visitor Centre (The Wildlife Trust for South & West Wales)
 Loddon Nature Reserve (Berks, Bucks & Oxon Wildlife Trust)
 Loggan's Moor (Cornwall Wildlife Trust)
 Lolly Moor (Norfolk Wildlife Trust)
 Long Clough (Derbyshire Wildlife Trust)
 Long Deans (Herts & Middlesex Wildlife Trust)
 Long Grove Wood (Berks, Bucks & Oxon Wildlife Trust)
 Long Hole Cliff (The Wildlife Trust for South & West Wales)
 Long Meadow (Worcestershire Wildlife Trust)
 Longburnford Quarry (Durham Wildlife Trust)
 Longfield Chalk Bank (Kent Wildlife Trust)
 Longhaven Cliffs (Scottish Wildlife Trust)
 Longis (Alderney Wildlife Trust)
 Longridge Moss (Scottish Wildlife Trust)
 Longspring Wood (Herts & Middlesex Wildlife Trust)
 Longworth Clough Nature Reserve (The Wildlife Trust for Lancashire, Manchester & north Merseyside)
 Lord's Lot Bog (The Wildlife Trust for Lancashire, Manchester & north Merseyside)
 Lord's Wood Quarry (Herefordshire Nature Trust)
 Lorton Meadows (Dorset Wildlife Trust)
 Loscombe (Dorset Wildlife Trust)
 Lots Grassland (Mendip) (Somerset Wildlife Trust)
 Loughborough Big Meadow (Leicestershire & Rutland Wildlife Trust)
 Loveny/Colliford (Cornwall Wildlife Trust)
 Low Barns (Durham Wildlife Trust)
 Low Wood Nature Reserve (Yorkshire Wildlife Trust)
 Lower East Lounston (Devon Wildlife Trust)
 Lower House Farm (Trust Headquarters) (Herefordshire Nature Trust)
 Lower Lewdon (Cornwall Wildlife Trust)
 Lower Minnetts Field (Gwent Wildlife Trust)
 Lower Moor Farm (Wiltshire Wildlife Trust)
 Lower Nethan Gorge (Scottish Wildlife Trust)
 Lower Shortditch Turbary (Shropshire Wildlife Trust)
 Lower Smite Farm (Worcestershire Wildlife Trust)
 Lower Test (Hampshire & IOW Wildlife Trust)
 Lower Wood (Herefordshire Nature Trust)
 Lower Wood (The Wildlife Trust for Bedfordshire, Cambridgeshire and Northamptonshire)
 Lower Wood, Ashwellthorpe (Norfolk Wildlife Trust)
 Lower Woods (Gloucestershire Wildlife Trust)
 Loxley Church Meadow (Warwickshire Wildlife Trust)
 Loynton Moss (Staffordshire Wildlife Trust)
 Lucas' Marsh Nature Reserve (Leicestershire & Rutland Wildlife Trust)
 Luckett (Cornwall Wildlife Trust)
 Ludwell Valley Park (Devon Wildlife Trust)
 Lugg Meadow (Herefordshire Nature Trust)
 Lugg Mills (Herefordshire Nature Trust)
 Luggiebank Wood (Scottish Wildlife Trust)~
 Lurkenhope (Shropshire Wildlife Trust)
 Lydden Temple Ewell - The James Teacher Reserve (Kent Wildlife Trust)
 Lymington Reedbeds (Hampshire & IOW Wildlife Trust)

M

 Maer Lake (Cornwall Wildlife Trust)
 Maes Hiraddug (North Wales Wildlife Trust)
 Magor Marsh SSSI (Gwent Wildlife Trust)
 Maldon Wick (Essex Wildlife Trust)
 Malling Down (Sussex Wildlife Trust)
 Maltby Low Common Nature Reserve (Yorkshire Wildlife Trust)
 Malton (Durham Wildlife Trust)
 Mambury Moor (Devon Wildlife Trust)
 Manor Farm (Surrey Wildlife Trust)
 Mansey Common (Nottinghamshire Wildlife Trust)
 Mapledurwell Fen/The Hatch (Hampshire & IOW Wildlife Trust)
 Mapperley Wood (Derbyshire Wildlife Trust)
 Marbury Reedbed (Cheshire Wildlife Trust)
 Marden Meadow (Kent Wildlife Trust)
 Marehill Quarry (Sussex Wildlife Trust)
 Marford Quarry (North Wales Wildlife Trust)
 Margaret's Wood (Gwent Wildlife Trust)
 Margrove Ponds (Tees Valley Wildlife Trust)
 Mariandyrys (North Wales Wildlife Trust)
 Market Weston Fen (Suffolk Wildlife Trust)
 Marline Valley (Sussex Wildlife Trust)
 Marshlands Meadow (Worcestershire Wildlife Trust)
 Marsland (Devon Wildlife Trust)
 Marsland Valley (Cornwall Wildlife Trust)
 Martham Broad National Nature Reserve (Norfolk Wildlife Trust)
 Martin's Meadow (Suffolk Wildlife Trust)
 Mascall's Wood (Mendips) (Somerset Wildlife Trust)
 Mawley Wood Track (Herefordshire Nature Trust)
 Max Bog (Avon Wildlife Trust)
 Maze Park (Tees Valley Wildlife Trust)
 McAlmont Reserves (Surrey Wildlife Trust)
 Meathop Moss (Cumbria Wildlife Trust)
 Meden Trail (Nottinghamshire Wildlife Trust)
 Meeth Quarry (Devon Wildlife Trust)
 Melincwrt Waterfalls (The Wildlife Trust for South & West Wales)
 Mellis Common (Suffolk Wildlife Trust)
 Melrose Farm Meadows (Worcestershire Wildlife Trust)
 Melverley Meadows (Shropshire Wildlife Trust)
 Mere Sands Wood Local Nature Reserve (The Wildlife Trust for Lancashire, Manchester & north Merseyside)
 Merrivale Wood (Herefordshire Nature Trust)
 Merry's Meadows (Leicestershire & Rutland Wildlife Trust)
 Meshaw Moor (Devon Wildlife Trust)
 Messingham Sand Quarry (Lincolnshire Wildlife Trust)
 Michael's Peace (Dorset Wildlife Trust)
 Mickfield Meadow (Suffolk Wildlife Trust)
 Micklemere (Suffolk Wildlife Trust)
 Middlebriars Wood (Surrey Wildlife Trust)
 Middledown (Mendips) (Somerset Wildlife Trust)
 Middleton Down (Wiltshire Wildlife Trust)
 Midger Wood (Gloucestershire Wildlife Trust)
 Milford Cutting (Ulster Wildlife Trust)
 Milford Green & Coxhill Green (Surrey Wildlife Trust)
 Milkhall Pond (Scottish Wildlife Trust)
 Milkwellburn Wood (Durham Wildlife Trust)
 Mill Bottom (Devon Wildlife Trust)
 Mill Burn (Northumberland Wildlife Trust)
 Mill Crook and Grafton Regis Meadow (The Wildlife Trust for Bedfordshire, Cambridgeshire and Northamptonshire)
 Mill Ham Island (Dorset Wildlife Trust)
 Mill Hill Quarry (Lincolnshire Wildlife Trust)
 Mill Meadow (Worcestershire Wildlife Trust)
 Miller's Dale Quarry (Derbyshire Wildlife Trust)
 Millfield Wood (Berks, Bucks & Oxon Wildlife Trust)
 Milton Heath and The Nower (Surrey Wildlife Trust)
 Milton Locks (Hampshire & IOW Wildlife Trust)
 Miners Rest (Herefordshire Nature Trust)
 Misson Carr (Nottinghamshire Wildlife Trust)
 Mitcheldean Meend Marsh (Gloucestershire Wildlife Trust)
 Monkwood (Worcestershire Wildlife Trust)
 Montrose Basin (Scottish Wildlife Trust)
 Moor Closes (Lincolnshire Wildlife Trust)
 Moor Copse (Berks, Bucks & Oxon Wildlife Trust)
 Moor Farm (Lincolnshire Wildlife Trust)
 Moor Piece Nature Reserve (The Wildlife Trust for Lancashire, Manchester & north Merseyside)
 Moorbridge Pond Nature Reserve (Nottinghamshire Wildlife Trust)
 Moorcroft Wood (The Wildlife Trust for Birmingham and the Black Country)
 Moorlands Nature Reserve (Yorkshire Wildlife Trust)
 Morfa Bychan & Greenacres (North Wales Wildlife Trust)
 Morgan's Hill (Wiltshire Wildlife Trust)
 Morley Brickyards (Derbyshire Wildlife Trust)
 Mortimer Terrace Reserve (London Wildlife Trust)
 Moseley Bog (The Wildlife Trust for Birmingham and the Black Country)
 Moss Valley Woodlands (Sheffield Wildlife Trust)
 Moston Community Nature Reserve (Cheshire Wildlife Trust)
 Moston Fairway (The Wildlife Trust for Lancashire, Manchester & north Merseyside)
 Motlins Hole (Herefordshire Nature Trust)
 Moulton Marsh (Lincolnshire Wildlife Trust)
 Mounsey (Somerset Wildlife Trust)
 Mountsorrel Meadows (Leicestershire & Rutland Wildlife Trust)
 Moyola Waterfoot (Ulster Wildlife Trust)
 Muckton Wood (Lincolnshire Wildlife Trust)
 Mynydd Ffoesidoes (Radnorshire Wildlife Trust)
 Mythe Railway (Gloucestershire Wildlife Trust)

N

 Nansmellyn Marsh (Cornwall Wildlife Trust)
 Nant Melin (The Wildlife Trust for South & West Wales)
 Nantporth (North Wales Wildlife Trust)
 Narborough Bog (Leicestershire & Rutland Wildlife Trust)
 Narborough Railway Line (Norfolk Wildlife Trust)
 Nashenden Down (Kent Wildlife Trust)
 Naunton Court Fields (Worcestershire Wildlife Trust)
 Netcott's Meadow (Avon Wildlife Trust)
 Netherclay Community Woodland (Somerset Wildlife Trust)
 Neu-Lindsey (Gloucestershire Wildlife Trust)
 New Buckenham Common (Norfolk Wildlife Trust)
 New Cross Gate Cutting (London Wildlife Trust)
 New Ferry Butterfly Park (Cheshire Wildlife Trust)
 New Grove Meadows (Gwent Wildlife Trust)
 New Hill & Tannegar (Somerset Wildlife Trust)
 Newbold Quarry (Warwickshire Wildlife Trust)
 Newbourne Springs (Suffolk Wildlife Trust)
 Newbourne Wood (Worcestershire Wildlife Trust)
 Newdigate Brickworks (Surrey Wildlife Trust)
 Newland Grove (Essex Wildlife Trust)
 Newsham Pond (Northumberland Wildlife Trust)
 Newton Reigny (Cumbria Wildlife Trust)
 Next Ness (Cumbria Wildlife Trust)
 Nichols Moss (Cumbria Wildlife Trust)
 Nind (Gloucestershire Wildlife Trust)
 Ningwood Common (Hampshire & IOW Wildlife Trust)
 Nipstone Rock (Shropshire Wildlife Trust)
 Noar Hill (Hampshire & IOW Wildlife Trust)
 Norah Hanbury-Kelk Meadows (Suffolk Wildlife Trust)
 Norbury Park (Surrey Wildlife Trust)
 Nore Hill Chalk Pinnacle (Surrey Wildlife Trust)
 North Cave Wetlands Nature Reserve (Yorkshire Wildlife Trust)
 North Cliffe Wood Nature Reserve (Yorkshire Wildlife Trust)
 North Cove (Suffolk Wildlife Trust)
 North Muskham Lake (Nottinghamshire Wildlife Trust)
 North Newbald Becksies Nature Reserve (Yorkshire Wildlife Trust)
 North Predannack Downs (Cornwall Wildlife Trust)
 North Quarry (Leicestershire & Rutland Wildlife Trust)
 Warnborough Greens (Hampshire & IOW Wildlife Trust)
 North Wingfield (Derbyshire Wildlife Trust)
 Northside Wood (Scottish Wildlife Trust)
 Norwood Road (The Wildlife Trust for Bedfordshire, Cambridgeshire and Northamptonshire)
 Nower Wood (Surrey Wildlife Trust)
 Nunnery Mead (Dorset Wildlife Trust)
 Nupend Wood (Herefordshire Nature Trust)
 Nutfield Marsh (Surrey Wildlife Trust)

O

 Oakerthorpe (Derbyshire Wildlife Trust)
 Oakfield Wood (Essex Wildlife Trust)
 Oakhill Wood (London Wildlife Trust)
 Oakley Hill (Berks, Bucks & Oxon Wildlife Trust)
 Oakwood and Blacklow Spinneys (Warwickshire Wildlife Trust)
 Oare Marshes (Kent Wildlife Trust)
 Oare Meadow (Kent Wildlife Trust)
 Old Burghclere Lime Quarry (Hampshire & IOW Wildlife Trust)
 Old Ford Island (London Wildlife Trust)
 Old Lodge (Sussex Wildlife Trust)
 Old London Road (Gloucestershire Wildlife Trust)
 Old Nun Wood (Warwickshire Wildlife Trust)
 Old Park Hill (Kent Wildlife Trust)
 Old Park Wood (Herts & Middlesex Wildlife Trust)
 Old Sulehay (The Wildlife Trust for Bedfordshire, Cambridgeshire and Northamptonshire)
 Old Warden Tunnel (The Wildlife Trust for Bedfordshire, Cambridgeshire and Northamptonshire)
 Old Warren Hill (The Wildlife Trust for South & West Wales)
 Oldhall Ponds (Scottish Wildlife Trust)
 Orton Moss Nature Reserve (Cumbria Wildlife Trust)
 Osmanthorpe (Nottinghamshire Wildlife Trust)
 Oughtonhead (Herts & Middlesex Wildlife Trust)
 Oulton Marshes (Suffolk Wildlife Trust)
 Ouse Washes (The Wildlife Trust for Bedfordshire, Cambridgeshire and Northamptonshire)
 Over Kellet Pond (The Wildlife Trust for Lancashire, Manchester & north Merseyside)
 Overdale (Derbyshire Wildlife Trust)
 Overhall Grove (The Wildlife Trust for Bedfordshire, Cambridgeshire and Northamptonshire)
 Overton Cliff and Roydon's Corner (The Wildlife Trust for South & West Wales)
 Overton Mere (The Wildlife Trust for South & West Wales)
 Owl Wood and Pit Plantation (Yorkshire Wildlife Trust)
 Owley Wood (Cheshire Wildlife Trust)
 Oxey Mead (Berks, Bucks & Oxon Wildlife Trust)
 Oxley Meadow (Essex Wildlife Trust)
 Oyster's Coppice (Wiltshire Wildlife Trust)

P

 Page's Pasture (Herefordshire Nature Trust)
 Pagham Harbour (Sussex Wildlife Trust)
 Pamber Forest and Upper Inhams Copse (Hampshire & IOW Wildlife Trust)
 Pant Da (The Wildlife Trust for South & West Wales)
 Papercourt Marshes (Surrey Wildlife Trust)
 Papercourt Meadows (Surrey Wildlife Trust)
 Parc Slip (The Wildlife Trust for South & West Wales)
 Parish Field (Herefordshire Nature Trust)
 Park Gate Down - The Hector Wilks Reserve (Kent Wildlife Trust)
 Park Hall (The Wildlife Trust for Birmingham and the Black Country)
 Park Ham & Quarry Hangers (Surrey Wildlife Trust)
 Park Hoskyn (the Hayman Reserve) (Cornwall Wildlife Trust)
 Park Road Ponds (London Wildlife Trust)
 Parkridge Centre, Brueton Park, Solihull (Warwickshire Wildlife Trust)
 Parky Meadow (Herefordshire Nature Trust)
 Parliament Piece (Warwickshire Wildlife Trust)
 Parrot's Drumble (Staffordshire Wildlife Trust)
 Parsonage Moor (Berks, Bucks & Oxon Wildlife Trust)
 Parsonage Wood (Kent Wildlife Trust)
 Pasqueflower (Gloucestershire Wildlife Trust)
 Pasture Wharf (Lincolnshire Wildlife Trust)
 Pasturefields Saltmarsh (Staffordshire Wildlife Trust)
 Patmore Heath (Herts & Middlesex Wildlife Trust)
 Patrick's Wood (Cheshire Wildlife Trust)
 Pavenham Osier Beds (In memory of Horace Church) (The Wildlife Trust for Bedfordshire, Cambridgeshire and Northamptonshire)
 Pawson's Meadow (Lincolnshire Wildlife Trust)
 Payton Marsh (Somerset Wildlife Trust)
 Pearson Park Wildlife Garden (Yorkshire Wildlife Trust)
 Peascombe Reserve (Dorset Wildlife Trust)
 Peascroft Wood (The Wildlife Trust for Birmingham and the Black Country)
 Pease Dean (Scottish Wildlife Trust)
 Peel Wood (The Wildlife Trust for South & West Wales)
 Pegsdon Hills and Hoo Bit (The Wildlife Trust for Bedfordshire, Cambridgeshire and Northamptonshire)
 Pembroke Upper Mill Pond (The Wildlife Trust for South & West Wales)
 Pen Y Waun (Brecknock Wildlife Trust)
 Pendarves Wood (Cornwall Wildlife Trust)
 Penderi Cliffs (The Wildlife Trust for South & West Wales)
 Pengelli Forest (The Wildlife Trust for South & West Wales)
 Penlee Battery (Cornwall Wildlife Trust)
 Pennels Bank Wood (Worcestershire Wildlife Trust)
 Penny Hill Bank (Worcestershire Wildlife Trust)
 Penny Pasture Common (Nottinghamshire Wildlife Trust)
 Penorchard Meadows (Worcestershire Wildlife Trust)
 Pentaloe Glen & Convallaria Area (Herefordshire Nature Trust)
 Pentralltfach (The Wildlife Trust for South & West Wales)
 Pentrosfa Mire (Radnorshire Wildlife Trust)
 Pentwyn Farm SSSI (Gwent Wildlife Trust)
 Pepper Wood (Scottish Wildlife Trust)
 Peppercombe Wood (Wiltshire Wildlife Trust)
 Perceton Wood (Scottish Wildlife Trust)
 Perry Mead (Somerset Wildlife Trust)
 Petershill (Scottish Wildlife Trust)
 Peterstone Wentlooge Marshes SSSI (Gwent Wildlife Trust)
 Pevensey Marshes (Sussex Wildlife Trust)
 Pewit Island (Hampshire & IOW Wildlife Trust)
 Phillips's Point (Cornwall Wildlife Trust)
 Phyllis Currie (Essex Wildlife Trust)
 Pickering's Meadow (Lincolnshire Wildlife Trust)
 Pickering's Scrape (Cheshire Wildlife Trust)
 Piddle Brook Meadows (Worcestershire Wildlife Trust)
 Pilch Field (Berks, Bucks & Oxon Wildlife Trust)
 Pill Paddock (Avon Wildlife Trust)
 Pinchbeck Slipe (Lincolnshire Wildlife Trust)
 Pingle Wood and Cutting (The Wildlife Trust for Bedfordshire, Cambridgeshire and Northamptonshire)
 Piper's Hill & Dodderhill Commons (Worcestershire Wildlife Trust)
 Pirbright Ranges (Surrey Wildlife Trust)
 Pisgah Quarry (North Wales Wildlife Trust)
 Pitsford Reservoir (The Wildlife Trust for Bedfordshire, Cambridgeshire and Northamptonshire)
 Pleasington Old Hall Wood and Wildlife Garden (The Wildlife Trust for Lancashire, Manchester & north Merseyside)
 Ploughman Wood (Nottinghamshire Wildlife Trust)
 Plump Hill Dolomite Quarry (Gloucestershire Wildlife Trust)
 Polhill Bank (Kent Wildlife Trust)
 Pool Ellocks (Herefordshire Nature Trust)
 Poolhay Meadows (Worcestershire Wildlife Trust)
 Poor Mans Wood (The Wildlife Trust for South & West Wales)
 Poors Wood (Cheshire Wildlife Trust)
 Port Eynon Point (The Wildlife Trust for South & West Wales)
 Portbury Wharf (Avon Wildlife Trust)
 Porth Diana (North Wales Wildlife Trust)
 Portrack Marsh (Tees Valley Wildlife Trust)
 Portway Hill (Wildlife Trust for Birmingham and the Black Country)
 Possil Marsh (Scottish Wildlife Trust)
 Potteric Carr Nature Reserve (Yorkshire Wildlife Trust)
 Pound Wood (Essex Wildlife Trust)
 Powerstock Common (Dorset Wildlife Trust)
 Preece's Meadow (Herefordshire Nature Trust)
 Prees Branch Canal (Shropshire Wildlife Trust)
 Prestwick Carr (Northumberland Wildlife Trust)
 Priddacombe Downs (Cornwall Wildlife Trust)
 Prideaux Wood (Cornwall Wildlife Trust)
 Priestcliffe Lees (Derbyshire Wildlife Trust)
 Priestclose Wood (Northumberland Wildlife Trust)
 Priors Coppice (Leicestershire & Rutland Wildlife Trust)
 Prior's Meadow (The Wildlife Trust for South & West Wales)
 Prior's Wood (Avon Wildlife Trust)
 Priory Farm (Avon Wildlife Trust)
 Priory Fields (Warwickshire Wildlife Trust)
 Priory Wood SSSI (Gwent Wildlife Trust)
 Prisk Wood SSSI (Gwent Wildlife Trust)
 Prospect Fields (Somerset Wildlife Trust)
 Pryor's Wood (Herts & Middlesex Wildlife Trust)
 Pulfin Bog Nature Reserve (Yorkshire Wildlife Trust)
 Pumphouse Wood (Cheshire Wildlife Trust)
 Purbeck Marine Wildlife Reserve (Dorset Wildlife Trust)
 Purland Chase (Herefordshire Nature Trust)
 Purn Hill (Avon Wildlife Trust)
 Purwell Ninesprings (Herts & Middlesex Wildlife Trust)
 Puttenham Common (Surrey Wildlife Trust)
 Puxton Moor (Avon Wildlife Trust)
 Pwll Penarth (Montgomeryshire Wildlife Trust)
 Pwll Waun Cynon (The Wildlife Trust for South & West Wales)
 Pwllpatti (Radnorshire Wildlife Trust)
 Pwll-y-Wrach (Brecknock Wildlife Trust)

Q

 Quants (Somerset Wildlife Trust)
 Quarry Banks Nature Reserve (Cumbria Wildlife Trust)
 Quarry Holes Plantation (Nottinghamshire Wildlife Trust)
 Quarry Wood (Kent Wildlife Trust)
 Quarry Wood (Shropshire Wildlife Trust)
 Quebb Corner Meadow (Herefordshire Nature Trust)
 Queendown Warren (Kent Wildlife Trust)
 Quoit Heathland (Cornwall Wildlife Trust)

R

 Rabbitbank Wood (Durham Wildlife Trust)
 Rack Marsh (Berks, Bucks & Oxon Wildlife Trust)
 Rackenford and Knowstone Moors (Devon Wildlife Trust)
 Radford Meadows (Staffordshire Wildlife Trust)
 Radway Meadows (Warwickshire Wildlife Trust)
 Ragpath Heath (Durham Wildlife Trust)
 Rahoy Hills (Scottish Wildlife Trust)
 Rainton Meadows (Durham Wildlife Trust)
 Rainworth Heath (Nottinghamshire Wildlife Trust)
 Raisby Hill Grassland (Durham Wildlife Trust)
 Ramsden Corner (The Wildlife Trust for Bedfordshire, Cambridgeshire and Northamptonshire)
 Ramsey Heights (The Wildlife Trust for Bedfordshire, Cambridgeshire and Northamptonshire)
 Randalls Farm (The Wildlife Trust for Bedfordshire, Cambridgeshire and Northamptonshire)
 Randan Meadows (Worcestershire Wildlife Trust)
 Randan Wood (Worcestershire Wildlife Trust)
 Ranworth Broad (Norfolk Wildlife Trust)
 Rauceby Warren (Lincolnshire Wildlife Trust)
 Raveley Wood (The Wildlife Trust for Bedfordshire, Cambridgeshire and Northamptonshire)
 Ravensroost Wood and Meadow (Wiltshire Wildlife Trust)
 Ray Island and Bonners Saltings (Essex Wildlife Trust)
 Reculver Visitor Centre and Country Park (Kent Wildlife Trust)
 Red Hill (Lincolnshire Wildlife Trust)
 Red House (Montgomeryshire Wildlife Trust)
 Red Jacket Fen (The Wildlife Trust for South & West Wales)
 Red Moss of Balerno (Scottish Wildlife Trust)
 Red Moss of Netherley (Scottish Wildlife Trust)
 Red Rocks Marsh (Cheshire Wildlife Trust)
 Redcar Field (Durham Wildlife Trust)
 Redgrave & Lopham Fen (Suffolk Wildlife Trust)
 Redlake Cottage Meadows (Cornwall Wildlife Trust)
 Redley Cliff (The Wildlife Trust for South & West Wales)
 Reed Pond (Nottinghamshire Wildlife Trust)
 Rewe Mead (Somerset Wildlife Trust)
 Reydon Wood (Suffolk Wildlife Trust)
 Rhayader Tunnel (Radnorshire Wildlife Trust)
 Rhiwledyn (North Wales Wildlife Trust)
 Rhos Cefn Bryn (The Wildlife Trust for South & West Wales)
 Rhos Fiddle (Shropshire Wildlife Trust)
 Rhos Fullbrook (The Wildlife Trust for South & West Wales)
 Rhos Glandenys (The Wildlife Trust for South & West Wales)
 Rhos Glyn-yr-Helyg (The Wildlife Trust for South & West Wales)
 Rhos Pil-Bach & Pennar Fawr (The Wildlife Trust for South & West Wales)
 Rhos-y-Fforest (The Wildlife Trust for South & West Wales)
 Rhydspence Woodland (Herefordshire Nature Trust)
 Richmond Nature Garden (The Wildlife Trust for Birmingham and the Black Country)
 Riddlesdown (London Wildlife Trust)
 Ridley Bottom (Gloucestershire Wildlife Trust)
 Ridlins Mire (Herts & Middlesex Wildlife Trust)
 Rifle Butts Quarry Nature Reserve (Yorkshire Wildlife Trust)
 Rigsby Wood (Lincolnshire Wildlife Trust)
 Ringdown (Somerset Wildlife Trust)
 Ringstead Downs (Norfolk Wildlife Trust)
 Ripon Loop Nature Reserve (Yorkshire Wildlife Trust)
 Risley Glebe (Derbyshire Wildlife Trust)
 River Arrow Nature Reserve (Warwickshire Wildlife Trust)
 Robert's Field (Lincolnshire Wildlife Trust)
 Rocky Plantation (Leicestershire & Rutland Wildlife Trust)
 Rod Wood (Staffordshire Wildlife Trust)
 Rodborough Common (Surrey Wildlife Trust)
 Roding Valley Meadows (Essex Wildlife Trust)
 Rogiet Poorland (Gwent Wildlife Trust)
 Roman River Valley (Essex Wildlife Trust)
 Romers Wood (Herefordshire Nature Trust)
 Romney Marsh Visitor Centre (Kent Wildlife Trust)
 Ron Ward's meadow (Hampshire & IOW Wildlife Trust)
 Ropehaven Cliffs (Cornwall Wildlife Trust)
 Rose End Meadows (Derbyshire Wildlife Trust)
 Rosenannon Downs (Cornwall Wildlife Trust)
 Roslin Glen (Scottish Wildlife Trust)
 Roswell Pits (The Wildlife Trust for Bedfordshire, Cambridgeshire and Northamptonshire)
 Rothwell Country Park (Yorkshire Wildlife Trust)
 Rothwell Gullet (The Wildlife Trust for Bedfordshire, Cambridgeshire and Northamptonshire)
 Rothwell Pastures (Yorkshire Wildlife Trust)
 Rough Hill Wood (Warwickshire Wildlife Trust)
 Roughton Moor Wood (Lincolnshire Wildlife Trust)
 Rowley Green Common (London Wildlife Trust)
 Rowley Hills Nature Reserve (The Wildlife Trust for Birmingham and the Black Country)
 Rowsley Sidings (Derbyshire Wildlife Trust)
 Royate Hill (Avon Wildlife Trust)
 Roydon Common (Norfolk Wildlife Trust)
 Roydon Fen (Suffolk Wildlife Trust)
 Roydon Woods (Hampshire & IOW Wildlife Trust)
 Rudge End Quarry (Herefordshire Nature Trust)
 Rudheath (Cheshire Wildlife Trust)
 Ruewood (Shropshire Wildlife Trust)
 Ruggadon Middlepark (Devon Wildlife Trust)
 Ruggin (Somerset Wildlife Trust)
 Runfold Wood (Surrey Wildlife Trust)
 Rush Furlong (Lincolnshire Wildlife Trust)
 Rushbeds Wood (Berks, Bucks & Oxon Wildlife Trust)
 Rushy Mead (Essex Wildlife Trust)
 Rushy Platt (Wiltshire Wildlife Trust)
 Rutland Water (Leicestershire & Rutland Wildlife Trust)
 Ruxley Gravel Pits (Kent Wildlife Trust)
 Rye Harbour (Sussex Wildlife Trust)
 Rye Meads (Herts & Middlesex Wildlife Trust)
 Ryton Wood (Warwickshire Wildlife Trust)

S

 Sallowsprings (The Wildlife Trust for Bedfordshire, Cambridgeshire and Northamptonshire)
 Salmon Pastures (Sheffield Wildlife Trust)
 Salt Box Hill SSSI (London Wildlife Trust)
 Saltburn Gill (Tees Valley Wildlife Trust)
 Saltersley Moss (Cheshire Wildlife Trust)
 Saltfleetby - Theddlethorpe Dunes (Lincolnshire Wildlife Trust)
 Salthill Quarry Local Nature Reserve (The Wildlife Trust for Lancashire, Manchester & north Merseyside)
 Salthouse Marshes (Norfolk Wildlife Trust)
 Saltmarshe Delph Nature Reserve (Yorkshire Wildlife Trust)
 Sandilands Pit (Lincolnshire Wildlife Trust)
 Sands Meadows (Worcestershire Wildlife Trust)
 Sandwich and Pegwell Bay (Kent Wildlife Trust)
 Sandylay and Moat Woods (Essex Wildlife Trust)
 Sapperton Valley (Gloucestershire Wildlife Trust)
 Sawbridgeworth Marsh (Essex Wildlife Trust)
 Scanniclift Copse (Devon Wildlife Trust)
 Scarlett Visitor Centre and Nature Trail (Manx Wildlife Trust)
 Scarning Fen (Norfolk Wildlife Trust)
 Scotton Common (Lincolnshire Wildlife Trust)
 Seaforth Nature Reserve (The Wildlife Trust for Lancashire, Manchester & north Merseyside)
 Seale Chalk Pit (Surrey Wildlife Trust)
 Sean Hawkins Meadow (Cheshire Wildlife Trust)
 Seaton Cliffs (Scottish Wildlife Trust)
 Seccombe's Wood (Surrey Wildlife Trust)
 Sedge Hole Close (Lincolnshire Wildlife Trust)
 Sedger's Bank (The Wildlife Trust for South & West Wales)
 Sellers Wood (Nottinghamshire Wildlife Trust)
 Selwyns Wood (Sussex Wildlife Trust)
 Semer Water Nature Reserve (Yorkshire Wildlife Trust)
 Sergeants Orchard (Essex Wildlife Trust)
 Seven Barrows (Berks, Bucks & Oxon Wildlife Trust)
 Sevenoaks Wildlife Reserve and Jeffery Harrison Visitor Centre (Kent Wildlife Trust)
 Severn Farm Pond (Montgomeryshire Wildlife Trust)
 Sewell Cutting (The Wildlife Trust for Bedfordshire, Cambridgeshire and Northamptonshire)
 Shabden Park (Surrey Wildlife Trust)
 Shadowbrook Meadows (Warwickshire Wildlife Trust)
 Shadwell Wood (Essex Wildlife Trust)
 Sharnbrook Summit and Wymington Meadow (The Wildlife Trust for Bedfordshire, Cambridgeshire and Northamptonshire)
 Sharpham Moor (Somerset Wildlife Trust)
 Shepherd's Close (The Wildlife Trust for Bedfordshire, Cambridgeshire and Northamptonshire)
 Shepperlands Farm (Berks, Bucks & Oxon Wildlife Trust)
 Shepreth L Moor (The Wildlife Trust for Bedfordshire, Cambridgeshire and Northamptonshire)
 Sherburn Willows Nature Reserve (Yorkshire Wildlife Trust)
 Shewalton Sandpits (Scottish Wildlife Trust)
 Shewalton Wood (Scottish Wildlife Trust)
 Shian Wood (Scottish Wildlife Trust)
 Shibdon Pond (Durham Wildlife Trust)
 Short Wood and Southwick Wood (The Wildlife Trust for Bedfordshire, Cambridgeshire and Northamptonshire)
 Shotgate Thickets (Essex Wildlife Trust)
 Shut Heath Wood (Essex Wildlife Trust)
 Shutts Copse (Hampshire & IOW Wildlife Trust)
 Siccaridge Wood (Gloucestershire Wildlife Trust)
 Side Farm Meadows (Staffordshire Wildlife Trust)
 Sideland (Radnorshire Wildlife Trust)
 Silent Valley Local Nature Reserve SSSI (Gwent Wildlife Trust)
 Silverines Meadows (Lincolnshire Wildlife Trust)
 Simpson Salting's (Suffolk Wildlife Trust)
 Sinderland Green Woods (Cheshire Wildlife Trust)
 Sizewell Belts (Suffolk Wildlife Trust)
 Skaters' Meadow (The Wildlife Trust for Bedfordshire, Cambridgeshire and Northamptonshire)
 Skipper's Island (Essex Wildlife Trust)
 Skokholm Island (The Wildlife Trust for South & West Wales)
 Skomer Island (The Wildlife Trust for South & West Wales)
 Skylarks (Nottinghamshire Wildlife Trust)
 Sladden Wood (Kent Wildlife Trust)
 Slievenacloy (Ulster Wildlife Trust)
 Smallbrook Meadows (Wiltshire Wildlife Trust)
 Smardale Gill Nature Reserve (Cumbria Wildlife Trust)
 Snakeholm Pastures (Yorkshire Wildlife Trust)
 Snape Marshes (Suffolk Wildlife Trust)
 Snipe Dales (Lincolnshire Wildlife Trust)
 Snitterfield Bushes (Warwickshire Wildlife Trust)
 Snows Farm (Gloucestershire Wildlife Trust)
 Soham Meadow (The Wildlife Trust for Bedfordshire, Cambridgeshire and Northamptonshire)
 Sole Common Pond (Berks, Bucks & Oxon Wildlife Trust)
 Solutia Meadows SSSI (Gwent Wildlife Trust)
 Sopley Common (Dorset Wildlife Trust)
 Sotby Meadows (Lincolnshire Wildlife Trust)
 Sourlie Wood (Scottish Wildlife Trust)
 Sourton Quarry (Devon Wildlife Trust)
 South Blean (Kent Wildlife Trust)
 South Close Field (Northumberland Wildlife Trust)
 South Hill (Somerset Wildlife Trust)
 South House Pavement Nature Reserve (Yorkshire Wildlife Trust)
 South Efford Marsh (Devon Wildlife Trust)
 South Poorton (Dorset Wildlife Trust)
 South Swale (Kent Wildlife Trust)
 South Walney Nature Reserve (Cumbria Wildlife Trust)
 South Witham Verges (Lincolnshire Wildlife Trust)
 Southerham (Sussex Wildlife Trust)
 Southerscales Nature Reserve (Yorkshire Wildlife Trust)
 Southfield Farm Marsh (The Wildlife Trust for Bedfordshire, Cambridgeshire and Northamptonshire)
 Southmoor (Hampshire & IOW Wildlife Trust)
 Southorpe Meadow and Paddock (The Wildlife Trust for Bedfordshire, Cambridgeshire and Northamptonshire)
 Southwick Coast (Scottish Wildlife Trust)
 Sovell Down (Dorset Wildlife Trust)
 Sow Dale (Lincolnshire Wildlife Trust)
 Spa Ponds (Nottinghamshire Wildlife Trust)
 Spalford Warren (Nottinghamshire Wildlife Trust)
 Spencer Road Wetlands (London Wildlife Trust)
 Spey Bay (Scottish Wildlife Trust)
 Spinneyfields (Worcestershire Wildlife Trust)
 Spinnies, Aberogwen (North Wales Wildlife Trust)
 Spion Kop Quarry (Gloucestershire Wildlife Trust)
 Spong Wood (Kent Wildlife Trust)
 Spring Wood (Derbyshire Wildlife Trust)
 Springdale Farm (Gwent Wildlife Trust)
 Sprotbrough Flash Nature Reserve (Yorkshire Wildlife Trust)
 Spuckles & Kennelling Woods (Wilderness Down) (Kent Wildlife Trust)
 Spurn National Nature Reserve (Yorkshire Wildlife Trust)
 Spynes Mere (Surrey Wildlife Trust)
 St Catherine's Hill (Hampshire & IOW Wildlife Trust)
 St Erth Pits (Cornwall Wildlife Trust)
 St George's Island (Cornwall Wildlife Trust)
 St Lawrence Bank (Hampshire & IOW Wildlife Trust)
 St Lawrence Undercliff (Hampshire & IOW Wildlife Trust)
 St Nicholas Park (Northumberland Wildlife Trust)
 Stanborough Reedmarsh (Herts & Middlesex Wildlife Trust)
 Stanford Reservoir (The Wildlife Trust for Bedfordshire, Cambridgeshire and Northamptonshire)
 Stanford Warren (Essex Wildlife Trust)
 Stanground Newt Ponds (The Wildlife Trust for Bedfordshire, Cambridgeshire and Northamptonshire)
 Stanground Wash (The Wildlife Trust for Bedfordshire, Cambridgeshire and Northamptonshire)
 Stanley Moss (Durham Wildlife Trust)
 Stanton's Pit (Lincolnshire Wildlife Trust)
 Stapleton Mire (Devon Wildlife Trust)
 Staveley Nature Reserve (Yorkshire Wildlife Trust)
 Stenders Quarry (Gloucestershire Wildlife Trust)
 Stenhouse Wood (Scottish Wildlife Trust)
 Stephen's Vale (Avon Wildlife Trust)
 Stockbury Hill Wood (Kent Wildlife Trust)
 Stocker's Lake (Herts & Middlesex Wildlife Trust)
 Stocking Springs Wood (Herts & Middlesex Wildlife Trust)
 Stockings Meadow (Herefordshire Nature Trust)
 Stocksmoor Common Nature Reserve (Yorkshire Wildlife Trust)
 Stockton Cutting (Warwickshire Wildlife Trust)
 Stockwood Meadows (Worcestershire Wildlife Trust)
 Stockwood Open Space (Avon Wildlife Trust)
 Stoke Bruerne Brick Pits (The Wildlife Trust for Bedfordshire, Cambridgeshire and Northamptonshire)
 Stoke Common Meadows (Wiltshire Wildlife Trust)
 Stoke Floods (Warwickshire Wildlife Trust)
 Stoke Wood End Quarter (The Wildlife Trust for Bedfordshire, Cambridgeshire and Northamptonshire)
 Stone Wood (Kent Wildlife Trust)
 Stonebridge Meadows (Warwickshire Wildlife Trust)
 Stonehill Down (Dorset Wildlife Trust)
 Stonesby Quarry (Leicestershire & Rutland Wildlife Trust)
 Stoneycliffe Wood Nature Reserve (Yorkshire Wildlife Trust)
 Storton's Pits and Duston Mill Meadow (The Wildlife Trust for Bedfordshire, Cambridgeshire and Northamptonshire)
 Stow Maries Halt (Essex Wildlife Trust)
 Stowford Moor (Devon Wildlife Trust)
 Straidkilly (Ulster Wildlife Trust)
 Strawberry Banks (Gloucestershire Wildlife Trust)
 Strawberry Cottage Wood SSSI (Gwent Wildlife Trust)
 Strawberry Hills Heath (Nottinghamshire Wildlife Trust)
 Strensall Common Nature Reserve (Yorkshire Wildlife Trust)
 Stringer's Common (Surrey Wildlife Trust)
 Stuart Fawkes (Gloucestershire Wildlife Trust)
 Summer Leys (The Wildlife Trust for Bedfordshire, Cambridgeshire and Northamptonshire)
 Summerseat Nature Reserve (The Wildlife Trust for Lancashire, Manchester & north Merseyside)
 Sunnybank (Sheffield Wildlife Trust)
 Surfleet Lows (Lincolnshire Wildlife Trust)
 Sutton & Hollesley Commons (Suffolk Wildlife Trust)
 Sutton Holms (Dorset Wildlife Trust)
 Sutton's Pond (Somerset Wildlife Trust)
 Swanpond Copse (Hampshire & IOW Wildlife Trust)
 Swanpool Marsh (Devon Wildlife Trust)
 Swanvale (Cornwall Wildlife Trust)
 Swanwick Lakes (Hampshire & IOW Wildlife Trust)
 Sweeney Fen (Shropshire Wildlife Trust)
 Swettenham Meadows (Cheshire Wildlife Trust)
 Swift Valley Nature Reserve (Warwickshire Wildlife Trust)
 Swilley Swathes (Herefordshire Nature Trust)
 SWT Visitor Centre (Shropshire Wildlife Trust)
 Sydenham Hill Wood and Cox's Walk (London Wildlife Trust)
 Syderstone Common (Norfolk Wildlife Trust)
 Sydlings Copse (Berks, Bucks & Oxon Wildlife Trust)
 Sylvia's Meadow (Cornwall Wildlife Trust)

T

 Tadnoll and Winfrith Heath (Dorset Wildlife Trust)
 Taf Fechan (The Wildlife Trust for South & West Wales)
 Tailby Meadow (The Wildlife Trust for Bedfordshire, Cambridgeshire and Northamptonshire)
 Tailend Moss (Scottish Wildlife Trust)
 Talich (Scottish Wildlife Trust)
 Talley Lakes (The Wildlife Trust for South & West Wales)
 Tamar Estuary (Cornwall Wildlife Trust)
 Tarn Sike Nature Reserve (Cumbria Wildlife Trust)
 Tealham and Tadham Moor (Somerset Wildlife Trust)
 Teifi Marshes (The Wildlife Trust for South & West Wales)
 Temple Balsall (Warwickshire Wildlife Trust)
 Temple Carr Barr (The Wildlife Trust for South & West Wales)
 Ten Acre Wood and Meadows (London Wildlife Trust)
 Testwood Lakes (Hampshire & IOW Wildlife Trust)
 Tetney Blow Wells (Lincolnshire Wildlife Trust)
 Teversal Pasture (Nottinghamshire Wildlife Trust)
 Tewin Orchard and Hopkyns Wood (Herts & Middlesex Wildlife Trust)
 Tewinbury (Herts & Middlesex Wildlife Trust)
 Thacka Beck (Cumbria Wildlife Trust)
 The Avenue Washlands (Derbyshire Wildlife Trust)
 The Betts Reserve (Worcestershire Wildlife Trust)
 The Border Mires (Northumberland Wildlife Trust)
 The Byddwn (Brecknock Wildlife Trust)
 The Christopher Cadbury Wetland Reserve at Upton Warren (Worcestershire Wildlife Trust)
 The Deneway (Sussex Wildlife Trust)
 The Devenish Reserve (Wiltshire Wildlife Trust)
 The Devil's Spittleful & Rifle Range and Blackstone Farm Fields (Worcestershire Wildlife Trust)
 The Ercall (Shropshire Wildlife Trust)
 The Firs (Wiltshire Wildlife Trust)
 The Forest (Surrey Wildlife Trust)
 The Gill (Kent Wildlife Trust)
 The Greenway (London Wildlife Trust)
 The Gwen Finch Wetland Reserve (Worcestershire Wildlife Trust)
 The Hollies (Shropshire Wildlife Trust)
 The Howls (Tees Valley Wildlife Trust)
 The Knapp and Papermill Nature Reserve (Worcestershire Wildlife Trust)
 The Larches (Kent Wildlife Trust)
 The Lines Way (Yorkshire Wildlife Trust)
 The Lucas Reserve (The Wildlife Trust for South & West Wales)
 The Mens (Sussex Wildlife Trust)
 The Mere, Framlingham (Suffolk Wildlife Trust)
 The Michael Harper Reserves (Queens Wood) (Herefordshire Nature Trust)
 The Miley (Scottish Wildlife Trust)
 The Moors (Surrey Wildlife Trust)
 The Mount Wood (Herefordshire Nature Trust)
 Hoe Road Meadow (Hampshire & IOW Wildlife Trust)
 The Old Sludge Beds (Devon Wildlife Trust)
 The Park Campus, University of Gloucestershire (Gloucestershire Wildlife Trust)
 The Parks (Herefordshire Nature Trust)
 The Plantation (Shropshire Wildlife Trust)
 The Plens (The Wildlife Trust for Bedfordshire, Cambridgeshire and Northamptonshire)
 The Quinta (Cheshire Wildlife Trust)
 The Riddy (The Wildlife Trust for Bedfordshire, Cambridgeshire and Northamptonshire)
 The Rough (Devon Wildlife Trust)
 The Sheepleas (Surrey Wildlife Trust)
 The Shere Woodlands (Surrey Wildlife Trust)
 The Shrubberies (Lincolnshire Wildlife Trust)
 The Sturts North (Herefordshire Nature Trust)
 The Sturts South (Herefordshire Nature Trust)
 The Warren (London Wildlife Trust)
 The Wern (Gwent Wildlife Trust)
 Thelnetham Fen (Suffolk Wildlife Trust)
 Thompson Common (Norfolk Wildlife Trust)
 Thorley Wash (Herts and Middlesex Wildlife Trust)
 Thorndon Countryside Centre (Essex Wildlife Trust)
 Thornton Glen (Scottish Wildlife Trust)
 Thornton Wood (Cheshire Wildlife Trust)
 Thorpe Hay Meadow (Surrey Wildlife Trust)
 Thorpe Marsh Nature Reserve (Yorkshire Wildlife Trust)
 Thorpe Marshes Nature Reserve (Norfolk Wildlife Trust)
 Thorpe Wood (The Wildlife Trust for Bedfordshire, Cambridgeshire and Northamptonshire)
 Thorswood (Staffordshire Wildlife Trust)
 Three Corner Grove (London Wildlife Trust)
 Three Cornered Meadow (North Wales Wildlife Trust)
 Three Groves Wood (Gloucestershire Wildlife Trust)
 Thrift Wood (Essex Wildlife Trust)
 Thundry Meadows (Surrey Wildlife Trust)
 Thurlbear Wood (Somerset Wildlife Trust)
 Thurlby Fen Slipe (Lincolnshire Wildlife Trust)
 Thursford Wood (Norfolk Wildlife Trust)
 Tickenham Hill (Avon Wildlife Trust)
 Tiddesley Wood – the Harry Green Reserve (Worcestershire Wildlife Trust)
 Tilburstow Hill (Surrey Wildlife Trust)
 Tile Wood (Essex Wildlife Trust)
 Tilton Railway Cutting (Leicestershire & Rutland Wildlife Trust)
 Tincombe (Cornwall Wildlife Trust)
 Tiptree Heath (Essex Wildlife Trust)
 Titchmarsh (The Wildlife Trust for Bedfordshire, Cambridgeshire and Northamptonshire)
 Titley Pool (Herefordshire Nature Trust)
 Toby's Hill (Lincolnshire Wildlife Trust)
 Tocil Wood Nature Reserve (Warwickshire Wildlife Trust)
 Toft Tunnel (Lincolnshire Wildlife Trust)
 Tollesbury Wick (Essex Wildlife Trust)
 Tony's Patch (Northumberland Wildlife Trust)
 Tor Hole Fields (Somerset Wildlife Trust)
 Tortoiseshell Wood and Meadows (Lincolnshire Wildlife Trust)
 Totteridge Fields (London Wildlife Trust)
 Totternhoe (The Wildlife Trust for Bedfordshire, Cambridgeshire and Northamptonshire)
 Town Kelloe Bank (Durham Wildlife Trust)
 Townclose Hills (Yorkshire Wildlife Trust)
 Townsend (Dorset Wildlife Trust)
 Traeth Glaslyn (North Wales Wildlife Trust)
 Trebarwith (Cornwall Wildlife Trust)
 Trench Wood Nature Reserve (Worcestershire Wildlife Trust)
 Trentabank Reservoir (Cheshire Wildlife Trust)
 Tresayes (Cornwall Wildlife Trust)
 Treswell Wood Nature Reserve (Nottinghamshire Wildlife Trust)
 Trewalkin Meadow (Brecknock Wildlife Trust)
 Trimdon Grange Quarry (Durham Wildlife Trust)
 Trimley Marshes (Suffolk Wildlife Trust)
 Tring Reservoirs (Herts & Middlesex Wildlife Trust)
 Troublefield (Dorset Wildlife Trust)
 Tuckmill Meadow (Berks, Bucks & Oxon Wildlife Trust)
 Tudhoe Mill Wood (Durham Wildlife Trust)
 Tummel Shingle Islands (Scottish Wildlife Trust)
 Tunman Wood (Lincolnshire Wildlife Trust)
 Tunnel Hill Meadow (Worcestershire Wildlife Trust)
 Turners Field (Kent Wildlife Trust)
 Twentywellsick Wood Nature Reserve (Yorkshire Wildlife Trust)
 Two Tree Island (Essex Wildlife Trust)
 Twywell Hills and Dales (The Wildlife Trust for Bedfordshire, Cambridgeshire and Northamptonshire)
 Ty Brith (Montgomeryshire Wildlife Trust)
 Ty Newydd Gardens (The Wildlife Trust for South & West Wales)
 Tyland Barn (Kent Wildlife Trust)
 Tylcau Hill (Radnorshire Wildlife Trust)
 Tysoe Island (Warwickshire Wildlife Trust)
 Tywardreath Marsh (Cornwall Wildlife Trust)

U

 Ubley Warren (Somerset Wildlife Trust)
 Ufton Fields (Warwickshire Wildlife Trust)
 Ulverscroft (Leicestershire & Rutland Wildlife Trust)
 Umbra (Ulster Wildlife Trust)
 Underdown (Surrey Wildlife Trust)
 Uppacott Wood (Devon Wildlife Trust)
 Upper Coldwell Reservoir (The Wildlife Trust for Lancashire, Manchester & north Merseyside)
 Upper Dunsforth Carr Nature Reserve (Yorkshire Wildlife Trust)
 Upper Inhams Copse (Hampshire & IOW Wildlife Trust)
 Upper Nethan Gorge (Scottish Wildlife Trust)
 Upper Park Wood Nature Reserve (Yorkshire Wildlife Trust)
 Upper Ray Meadows (Berks, Bucks & Oxon Wildlife Trust)
 Upper Swingley Wood (Herefordshire Nature Trust)
 Upper Welson Marsh (Herefordshire Nature Trust)
 Upton Broad and Marshes (Norfolk Wildlife Trust)
 Upton Heath (Dorset Wildlife Trust)
 Upton Meadow (Cornwall Wildlife Trust)
 Upton Towans (Cornwall Wildlife Trust)
 Upwood Meadows (The Wildlife Trust for Bedfordshire, Cambridgeshire and Northamptonshire)
 Uxbridge Alderglade (Herts & Middlesex Wildlife Trust)
 Uxbridge College Pond (London Wildlife Trust)
 Uxbridge Moor (London Wildlife Trust)

V

 Val du Saou (Alderney Wildlife Trust)
 Vann Lake (Surrey Wildlife Trust)
 Vealand Farm (Devon Wildlife Trust)
 Veilstone Moor (Devon Wildlife Trust)
 Vell Mill Daffodil Meadow (Gloucestershire Wildlife Trust)
 Venn Ottery (Devon Wildlife Trust)
 Ventongimps Moor (Cornwall Wildlife Trust)
 Vicarage Meadows (Brecknock Wildlife Trust)
 Vincent's Wood (Wiltshire Wildlife Trust)
 Volehouse Moor (Devon Wildlife Trust)

W

 Waitby Greenriggs Nature Reserve (Cumbria Wildlife Trust)
 Walborough (Avon Wildlife Trust)
 Walkeringham Nature Reserve (Nottinghamshire Wildlife Trust)
 Wallacebank Wood (Scottish Wildlife Trust)
 Wallis Wood (Surrey Wildlife Trust)
 Waltham Brooks (Sussex Wildlife Trust)
 Walton Common (Avon Wildlife Trust)
 Wangford Warren (Suffolk Wildlife Trust)
 Wanlip Meadows (Leicestershire & Rutland Wildlife Trust)
 Wansford Pasture & Standen's Pasture (The Wildlife Trust for Bedfordshire, Cambridgeshire and Northamptonshire)
 Wappenbury Wood (Warwickshire Wildlife Trust)
 Warburg Nature Reserve (Berks, Bucks & Oxon Wildlife Trust)
 Warburton's Wood (Cheshire Wildlife Trust)
 Waresley & Gransden Woods (The Wildlife Trust for Bedfordshire, Cambridgeshire and Northamptonshire)
 Warleigh Point (Devon Wildlife Trust)
 Warley Place (Essex Wildlife Trust)
 Warren Bank (Berks, Bucks & Oxon Wildlife Trust)
 Warton Crag (The Wildlife Trust for Lancashire, Manchester & north Merseyside)
 Water Haigh Woodland Park (Yorkshire Wildlife Trust)
 Waterford Heath (Herts & Middlesex Wildlife Trust)
 Waterloo (Herefordshire Nature Trust)
 Watford Lodge (Derbyshire Wildlife Trust)
 Wattle Wood (Kent Wildlife Trust)
 Watts Bank (Berks, Bucks & Oxon Wildlife Trust)
 Watts Wood (Lincolnshire Wildlife Trust)
 Wayland Wood (Norfolk Wildlife Trust)
 Weag's Barn (Staffordshire Wildlife Trust)
 Weavers Down Bog (Hampshire & IOW Wildlife Trust)
 Weeleyhall Wood (Essex Wildlife Trust)
 Weeting Heath National Nature Reserve (Norfolk Wildlife Trust)
 Weetslade Country Park (Northumberland Wildlife Trust)
 Welches Meadow (Warwickshire Wildlife Trust)
 Welcombe Hills (Warwickshire Wildlife Trust)
 Wellington Castle Fields (Somerset Wildlife Trust)
 Wells Farm (Berks, Bucks & Oxon Wildlife Trust)
 Welton-le-Wold (Lincolnshire Wildlife Trust)
 Welwick Saltmarsh Nature Reserve (Yorkshire Wildlife Trust)
 Wem Moss (Shropshire Wildlife Trust)
 Wembury Marine Centre (Devon Wildlife Trust)
 Wentworth (Surrey Wildlife Trust)
 Wern Plemys (Brecknock Wildlife Trust)
 Wern Wood (Herefordshire Nature Trust)
 Werndryd (Radnorshire Wildlife Trust)
 Wessington Wood & Pasture (Herefordshire Nature Trust)
 West Bexington (Dorset Wildlife Trust)
 West Blean and Thornden Woods (Kent Wildlife Trust)
 West Burton Meadow (Nottinghamshire Wildlife Trust)
 West Coker Fen (Somerset Wildlife Trust)
 West Dean Woods (Sussex Wildlife Trust)
 West Fleetham (Northumberland Wildlife Trust)
 West Humble Bat Reserve (Surrey Wildlife Trust)
 West Kent Golf Course (London Wildlife Trust)
 West Quarry Braes (Scottish Wildlife Trust)
 West Williamston (The Wildlife Trust for South & West Wales)
 West Wood (Essex Wildlife Trust)
 Westfield Pill (The Wildlife Trust for South & West Wales)
 Westfield Wood (Kent Wildlife Trust)
 Westhay Heath (Somerset Wildlife Trust)
 Westhay Moor NNR (Somerset Wildlife Trust)
 Westhouse Wood (Essex Wildlife Trust)
 Weston Big Wood (Avon Wildlife Trust)
 Weston Moor (Avon Wildlife Trust)
 Weston Turville Reservoir (Berks, Bucks & Oxon Wildlife Trust)
 Westwell Gorse (Berks, Bucks & Oxon Wildlife Trust)
 Wharram Quarry Nature Reserve (Yorkshire Wildlife Trust)
 Wheldrake Ings Nature Reserve (Yorkshire Wildlife Trust)
 Whelford Pools (Gloucestershire Wildlife Trust)
 Whippets Cant (Surrey Wildlife Trust)
 Whisby Nature Park (Lincolnshire Wildlife Trust)
 Whitacre Heath SSSI (Warwickshire Wildlife Trust)
 Whitbarrow - Howe Ridding Wood (Cumbria Wildlife Trust)
 Whitbarrow-Hervey Memorial Reserve (Cumbria Wildlife Trust)
 Whitbourne Glebe (Herefordshire Nature Trust)
 Whitcliffe Common (Shropshire Wildlife Trust)
 White Downs (Surrey Wildlife Trust)
 White Rocks (Herefordshire Nature Trust)
 Whitecross Green Wood (Berks, Bucks & Oxon Wildlife Trust)
 Whitefield (Somerset Wildlife Trust)
 Whitehouse Meadow (Hampshire & IOW Wildlife Trust)
 Whitelee Moor (Northumberland Wildlife Trust)
 Whitlaw Wood (Scottish Wildlife Trust)
 Whitmoor & Rickford Common (Surrey Wildlife Trust)
 Whitnash Brook (Warwickshire Wildlife Trust)
 Whittle Dene (Northumberland Wildlife Trust)
 Wicksteed Park (The Wildlife Trust for Bedfordshire, Cambridgeshire and Northamptonshire)
 Wigan Flashes Local Nature Reserve (The Wildlife Trust for Lancashire, Manchester & north Merseyside)
 Wigpool (Gloucestershire Wildlife Trust)
 Wilden Marsh (Worcestershire Wildlife Trust)
 Wilderness Island (London Wildlife Trust)
 Wildmoor Heath (Berks, Bucks & Oxon Wildlife Trust)
 Wilford Claypit (Nottinghamshire Wildlife Trust)
 Williamston (Northumberland Wildlife Trust)
 Willington Gravel Pits (Derbyshire Wildlife Trust)
 Willoughby Branch Line (Lincolnshire Wildlife Trust)
 Willoughby Meadow (Lincolnshire Wildlife Trust)
 Willow Farm Wood Nature Reserve (The Wildlife Trust for Lancashire, Manchester & north Merseyside)
 Willow Garth Nature Reserve (Yorkshire Wildlife Trust)
 Willow Tree Fen (Lincolnshire Wildlife Trust)
 Willowmead (Herts & Middlesex Wildlife Trust)
 Willsbridge Valley (Avon Wildlife Trust)
 Wilson's Pits (The Wildlife Trust for Bedfordshire, Cambridgeshire and Northamptonshire)
 Wilwell Farm Cutting Nature Reserve (Nottinghamshire Wildlife Trust)
 Wimberry Quarries (Gloucestershire Wildlife Trust)
 Windmill Farm (Cornwall Wildlife Trust)
 Windmill Hill (Worcestershire Wildlife Trust)
 Windmill Spinney (Warwickshire Wildlife Trust)
 Wingmoor Farm Meadow (Gloucestershire Wildlife Trust)
 Winks Meadow (Suffolk Wildlife Trust)
 Winnall Moors (Hampshire & IOW Wildlife Trust)
 Wisley & Ockham Commons (Surrey Wildlife Trust)
 Wistow Wood (The Wildlife Trust for Bedfordshire, Cambridgeshire and Northamptonshire)
 Withdean Woods (Sussex Wildlife Trust)
 Withial Combe (Somerset Wildlife Trust)
 Withybeds (Radnorshire Wildlife Trust)
 Wolborough Fen (Devon Wildlife Trust)
 Wolla Bank Pit (Lincolnshire Wildlife Trust)
 Wolla Bank Reedbed (Lincolnshire Wildlife Trust)
 Wolseley Centre (Staffordshire Wildlife Trust)
 Wood Lane (Shropshire Wildlife Trust)
 Woodah Farm (Devon Wildlife Trust)
 Woodford Halse (The Wildlife Trust for Bedfordshire, Cambridgeshire and Northamptonshire)
 Woodhall Dean (Scottish Wildlife Trust)
 Woodham Fen (Essex Wildlife Trust)
 Woodhouse Washlands Nature Reserve (Wildlife Trust for Sheffield and Rotherham)
 Woods Mill (Sussex Wildlife Trust)
 Woodside (Derbyshire Wildlife Trust)
 Woodside (Herefordshire Nature Trust) 
 Woodsides Meadow (Berks, Bucks & Oxon Wildlife Trust)
 Woodston Ponds (The Wildlife Trust for Bedfordshire, Cambridgeshire and Northamptonshire)
 Woodthorpe Meadow (Nottinghamshire Wildlife Trust)
 Woodwalton Marsh (The Wildlife Trust for Bedfordshire, Cambridgeshire and Northamptonshire)
 Woorgreens (Gloucestershire Wildlife Trust)
 Wortham Ling (Suffolk Wildlife Trust)
 Wotton, Abinger & Broadmoor Commons (Surrey Wildlife Trust)
 Wrabness Nature Reserve (Essex Wildlife Trust)
 Wreay Woods Nature Reserve (Cumbria Wildlife Trust)
 Wyeswood Common (Gwent Wildlife Trust)
 Wyevale Wood (Herefordshire Nature Trust)
 Wyken Slough (Warwickshire Wildlife Trust)
 Wymeswold Meadows (Leicestershire & Rutland Wildlife Trust)
 Wyming Brook (Sheffield Wildlife Trust)
 Wymondham Rough (Leicestershire & Rutland Wildlife Trust)
 Wyver Lane (Derbyshire Wildlife Trust)

X

Y

 Y Ddol Uchaf (North Wales Wildlife Trust)
 Y Graig (North Wales Wildlife Trust)
 Y Gweira (The Wildlife Trust for South & West Wales)
 Yarley Fields (Somerset Wildlife Trust)
 Yarty Moor (Somerset Wildlife Trust)
 Yarwell Dingle and Pond (The Wildlife Trust for Bedfordshire, Cambridgeshire and Northamptonshire)
 Yeading Brook Meadows (London Wildlife Trust)
 Yellands Meadow Nature Reserve (Yorkshire Wildlife Trust)
 Yetholm Loch (Scottish Wildlife Trust)
 Yockletts Bank (Kent Wildlife Trust)

Z

References

Wildlife Trust
Nature reserves in the United Kingdom